This List of Professional Rodeo Cowboys Association Champions contains champions and awards in the sport of professional rodeo. The Professional Rodeo Cowboys Association (PRCA) is the oldest and largest professional rodeo organization in the United States that sanctions men's events. The PRCA is based in Colorado Springs, Colorado. This article lists all of the major champions from each of the events held yearly at the National Finals Rodeo (NFR) and the National Finals Steer Roping (NFSR). Barrel racing finals also take place at the NFR but are sanctioned by the Women's Professional Rodeo Association (WPRA). It also lists the All-Around Champion, awarded to the competitor who wins the most prize money in a year competing in at least two events. The bucking livestock from the three roughstock events are also awarded championships titled stock of the year. Also listed are the winners of various awards given during the NFR, such as the timed-event awards for AQHA/PRCA Horse of the Year and the Top NFR Bucking Stock. The PRCA also runs the ProRodeo Hall of Fame which inducts new members annually.

The world championships awarded by this organization are the highest rodeo honors given in the rodeo profession. The PRCA also inducts notable people and livestock into its Hall of Fame.

Professional Rodeo Cowboys Association 

The Professional Rodeo Cowboys Association , the National Finals Rodeo, and the National Finals Steer Roping and their history are tracked in separate articles.

PRCA World Champions

All-Around Champions 
 2022 Stetson Wright, Milford, Utah
 2021 Stetson Wright, Milford, Utah
 2020 Stetson Wright, Milford, Utah,
 2019 Stetson Wright, Milford, Utah
 2018 Trevor Brazile, Decatur, Texas
 2017 Tuf Cooper, Decatur, Texas
 2016 Junior Nogueira, Presidente Prudente, São Paulo, Brazil
 2015 Trevor Brazile, Decatur, Texas
 2014 Trevor Brazile, Decatur, Texas 
 2013 Trevor Brazile, Decatur, Texas 
 2012 Trevor Brazile, Decatur, Texas 
 2011 Trevor Brazile, Decatur, Texas 
 2010 Trevor Brazile, Decatur, Texas 
 2009 Trevor Brazile, Decatur, Texas 
 2008 Trevor Brazile, Decatur, Texas 
 2007 Trevor Brazile, Decatur, Texas 
 2006 Trevor Brazile, Decatur, Texas 
 2005 Ryan Jarrett, Summerville, Georgia 
 2004 Trevor Brazile, Decatur, Texas 
 2003 Trevor Brazile, Decatur, Texas 
 2002 Trevor Brazile, Anson, Texas 
 2001 Cody Ohl, Stephenville, Texas 
 2000 Joe Beaver, Huntsville, Texas
 1999 Fred Whitfield, Hockley, Texas 
 1998 Ty Murray, Stephenville, Texas 
 1997 Dan Mortensen, Manhattan, Montana 
 1996 Joe Beaver, Huntsville, Texas 
 1995 Joe Beaver, Huntsville, Texas 
 1994 Ty Murray, Stephenville, Texas 
 1993 Ty Murray, Stephenville, Texas 
 1992 Ty Murray, Stephenville, Texas 
 1991 Ty Murray, Stephenville, Texas 
 1990 Ty Murray, Stephenville, Texas 
 1989 Ty Murray, Odessa, Texas 
 1988 Dave Appleton, Arlington, Texas 
 1987 Lewis Feild, Elk Ridge, Utah 
 1986 Lewis Feild, Elk Ridge, Utah 
 1985 Lewis Feild, Elk Ridge, Utah 
 1984 Dee Pickett, Caldwell, Idaho 
 1983 Roy Cooper, Durant, Oklahoma 
 1982 Chris Lybbert, Coyote, California 
 1981 Jimmie Cooper, Monument, New Mexico 
 1980 Paul Tierney, Rapid City, South Dakota 
 1979 Tom Ferguson, Miami, Oklahoma 
 1978 Tom Ferguson, Miami, Oklahoma 
 1977 Tom Ferguson, Miami, Oklahoma 
 1976 Tom Ferguson, Miami, Oklahoma 
 1975 Leo Camarillo, Oakdale, California (tie) 
 1975 Tom Ferguson, Miami, Oklahoma (tie) 
 1974 Tom Ferguson, Miami, Oklahoma 
 1973 Larry Mahan, Dallas, Texas 
 1972 Phil Lyne, George West, Texas 
 1971 Phil Lyne, George West, Texas 
 1970 Larry Mahan, Brooks, Oregon 
 1969 Larry Mahan, Salem, Oregon 
 1968 Larry Mahan, Salem, Oregon 
 1967 Larry Mahan, Brooks, Oregon 
 1966 Larry Mahan, Brooks, Oregon 
 1965 Dean Oliver, Boise, Idaho 
 1964 Dean Oliver, Boise, Idaho 
 1963 Dean Oliver, Boise, Idaho 
 1962 Tom Nesmith, Bethel, Oklahoma 
 1961 Benny Reynolds, Melrose, Montana 
 1960 Harry Tompkins, Dublin, Texas 
 1959 Jim Shoulders, Henryetta, Oklahoma 
 1958 Jim Shoulders, Henryetta, Oklahoma 
 1957 Jim Shoulders, Henryetta, Oklahoma 
 1956 Jim Shoulders, Henryetta, Oklahoma 
 1955 Casey Tibbs, Fort Pierre, South Dakota
 1954 Buck Rutherford, Lenapah, Oklahoma 
 1953 Bill Linderman, Red Lodge, Montana
 1952 Harry Tompkins, Dublin, Texas
 1951 Casey Tibbs, Fort Pierra, South Dakota
 1950 Bill Linderman, Red Lodge, Montana
 1949 Jim Shoulders, Henryetta, Oklahoma
 1948 Gerald Roberts, Strong City, Kansas 
 1947 Todd Whatley, Hugo, Oklahoma
 1946 No All-Around Champion this year
 1945 No All-Around Champion this year
 1944 Louis Brooks, Pittsburg, Kansas
 1943 Louis Brooks, Pittsburg, Kansas
 1942 Gerald Roberts, Strong City, Kansas
 1941 Homer Pettigrew, Grady, New Mexico
 1940 Firtz Truan, Long Beach, California
 1939 Paul Carney, Galeton, Colorado
 1938 Burel Mulkey, Salmon, Idaho
 1937 Everett Bowman, Hillside, Arizona
 1936 John Bowman, Oakdale, California
 1935 Everett Bowman, Hillside, Arizona
 1934 Leonard Ward, Talent, Oregon
 1933 Clay Carr, Visalia, California
 1932 Donald Nesbit, Snowflake, Arizona
 1931 Johnie Schneider, Livermore, California
 1930 Clay Carr, Visalia, California
 1929 Earl Thode, Belvidere, South Dakota
Source:

Bareback Riding Champions 
 2022 Jess Pope, Waverly, Kansas
 2021 Kaycee Feild, Genola, Utah 
 2020 Kaycee Feild, Genola, Utah
 2019 Clayton Bigelow, Clements, California
 2018 Tim O'Connell, Zwingle, Iowa
 2017 Tim O'Connell, Zwingle, Iowa
 2016 Tim O'Connell, Zwingle, Iowa
 2015 Steven Peebles, Redmond, Oregon
 2014 Kaycee Feild, Spanish Fork, Utah
 2013 Kaycee Feild, Spanish Fork, Utah
 2012 Kaycee Feild, Spanish Fork, Utah
 2011 Kaycee Feild, Payson, Utah
 2010 Bobby Mote, Culver, Oregon
 2009 Bobby Mote, Culver, Oregon
 2008 Justin McDaniel, Porum, Oklahoma
 2007 Bobby Mote, Culver, Oregon
 2006 Will Lowe, Canyon, Texas
 2005 Will Lowe, Canyon, Texas
 2004 Kelly Timberman, Mills, Wyoming
 2003 Will Lowe, Canyon, Texas
 2002 Bobby Mote, Redmond, Oregon
 2001 Lan LaJeunesse, Morgan, Utah
 2000 Jeffrey Collins, Redfield, Kansas
 1999 Lan LaJeunesse, Morgan, Utah
 1998 Mark Gomes, Hutchinson, Kansas
 1997 Eric Mouton, Weatherford, Oklahoma
 1996 Mark Garrett, Spearfish, South Dakota
 1995 Marvin Garrett, Belle Fourche, South Dakota
 1994 Marvin Garrett, Belle Fourche, South Dakota
 1993 Deb Greenough, Red Lodge, Montana
 1992 Wayne Herman, Dickinson, North Dakota
 1991 Cint Corey, Kennewick, Washington
 1990 Chuck Logue, Decatur, Texas
 1989 Marvin Garrett, Belle Fourche, South Dakota
 1988 Marvin Garrett, Gillette, Wyoming
 1987 Bruce Ford, Kersey, Colorado
 1986 Lewis Feild, Elk Ridge, Utah
 1985 Lewis Feild, Elk Ridge, Utah
 1984 Larry Peabody, Three Forks, Montana
 1983 Bruce Ford, Kersey, Colorado
 1982 Bruce Ford, Kersey, Colorado
 1981 J.C. Trujillo, Steamboat Springs, Colorado
 1980 Bruce Ford, Kersey, Colorado
 1979 Bruce Ford, Evans, Colorado
 1978 Jack Ward Jr., Springdale, Arkansas
 1977 Jack Ward Jr., Springdale, Arkansas
 1976 Chris LeDoux, Kaycee, Wyoming
 1975 Joe Alexander, Cora, Wyoming
 1974 Joe Alexander, Cora, Wyoming
 1973 Joe Alexander, Cora, Wyoming
 1972 Joe Alexander, Cora, Wyoming
 1971 Joe Alexander, Cora, Wyoming
 1970 Paul Mayo, Fort Worth, Texas
 1969 Gary Tucker, Carlsbad, New Mexico
 1968 Clyde Vamvoras, Burkburnett, Texas
 1967 Clyde Vamvoras, Burkburnett, Texas
 1966 Paul Mayo, Grinnell, Iowa
 1965 Jim Houston, Omaha, Nebraska
 1964 Jim Houston, Omaha, Nebraska
 1963 John Hawkins, Twain Harte, California
 1962 Ralph Buell, Sheridan, Wyoming
 1961 Eddy Akridge, Midland, Texas
 1960 Jack Buschbom, Cassville, Wisconsin
 1959 Jack Buschbom, Cassville, Wisconsin
 1958 Jim Shoulders, Henryetta, Oklahoma
 1957 Jim Shoulders, Henryetta, Oklahoma
 1956 Jim Shoulders, Henryetta, Oklahoma
 1955 Eddy Akridge, Midland, Texas
 1954 Eddy Akridge, Midland, Texas
 1953 Eddy Akridge, Midland, Texas
 1952, Harry Tompkins, Dublin, Texas
 1951 Casey Tibbs, Fort Pierra, South Dakota
 1950 Jim Shoulders, Henryetta, Oklahoma
 1949 Jack Buschbom, Cassville, Wisconsin
 1948 Sonny Tureman, John Day, Oregon
 1947 Larry Finley, Phoenix, Arizona
 1946 Bud Spealman, Fort Worth, Texas
 1945 Bud Linderman, Red Lodge, Montana
 1944 Louis Brooks, Pittsburg, Oklahoma
 1943 Bud Linderman, Red Lodge, Montana
 1942 Louis Brooks, Pittsburg, Oklahoma
 1941 George Mills, Montrose, California
 1940 Carl Dossey, Phoenix, Arizona
 1939 Paul Carney, Galeton, Colorado
 1938 Pete Grubb, Salmon, Idaho
 1937 Paul Carney, Galeton, Colorado
 1936 Smoky Snyder, Kimberley, British Columbia, Canada
 1935 Frank Schneider, Caliente, California
 1934 Leonard Ward, Talent, Oregon
 1933 Nate Woldum, Strathmore, Alberta, Canada
 1932 Smoky Snyder, Kimberley, British Columbia, Canada
Source:

Steer Wrestling Champions 
 2022 Tyler Waguespack, Gonzales, Louisiana
 2021 Tyler Waguespack, Gonzales, Louisiana 
 2020 Jacob Edler, State Center, Iowa
 2019 Ty Erickson, Helena, Montana
 2018 Tyler Waguespack, Gonzales, Louisiana
 2017 Tyler Pearson, Louisville, Mississippi 
 2016 Tyler Waguespack, Gonzales, Louisiana
 2015 Hunter Cure, Holliday, Texas
 2014 Luke Branquinho, Los Alamos, California
 2013 Hunter Cure, Holliday, Texas
 2012 Luke Branquinho, Los Alamos, California
 2011 Luke Branquinho, Los Alamos, California
 2010 Dean Gorsuch, Gering, Nebraska
 2009  Lee Graves, Calgary, Alberta, Canada
 2008 Luke Branquinho, Los Alamos, California
 2007 Jason Miller, Lance Creek, Wyoming
 2006 Dean Gorsuch, Gering, Nebraska
 2005 Lee Graves, Calgary, Alberta, Canada
 2004 Luke Branquinho, Los Alamos, California
 2003 Teddy Johnson, Checotah, Oklahoma
 2002 Sid Steiner, Bastrop, Texas
 2001 Rope Myers, Van, Texas
 2000 Frank Thompson, Cheyenne, Wyoming
 1999 Mickey Gee, Wichita Falls, Texas
 1998 Mike Smith, Baton Rouge, Louisiana
 1997 Brad Gleason, Touchet, Washington
 1996 Chad Bedell, Jensen, Utah
 1995 Ote Berry, Checotah, Oklahoma
 1994 Blaine Pederson, Amisk, Alberta, Canada
 1993 Steve Duhon, Opelousas, Louisiana
 1992 Mark Roy, Dalemead, Alberta, Canada
 1991 Ote Berry, Checotah, Oklahoma
 1990 Ote Berry, Checotah, Oklahoma
 1989 John W Jones Jr., Morro Bay, California
 1988 John W Jones Jr., Morro Bay, California
 1987 Steve Duhon, Opelousas, Louisiana
 1986 Steve Duhon, Opelousas, Louisiana
 1985 Ote Berry, Gordon, Nebraska
 1984 John W Jones Jr., Morro Bay, California
 1983 Joel Edmondson, Columbus, Kansas
 1982 Stan Williamson, Kellyville, Oklahoma
 1981 Byron Walker, Ennis, Texas
 1980 Butch Myers, Welda, Kansas
 1979 Stan Williamson, Kellyville, Oklahoma
 1978 Tom Ferguson, Miami, Oklahoma
 1977 Tom Ferguson, Miami, Oklahoma
 1976 Rick Bradley, Burkburnett, Texas
 1975 Frank Shepperson, Midwest, Wyoming
 1974 Tommy Puryear, Norman, Oklahoma
 1973 Bob Marshall, San Martin, California
 1972 Roy Duvall, Warner, Oklahoma
 1971 Bill Hale, Checotah, Oklahoma
 1970 John W. Jones Sr., Morro Bay, California
 1969 Roy Duvall, Boynton, Oklahoma
 1968 Jack Roddy, San Jose, California
 1967 Roy Duvall, Boynton, Oklahoma
 1966 Jack Roddy, San Jose, California
 1965 Harley May, Oakdale, California
 1964 C.R. Boucher, Burkburnett, Texas
 1963 Jim Bynum, Waxahachie, Texas
 1962 Tom Nesmith, Bethel, Oklahoma
 1961 Jim Bynum, Forreston, Texas
 1960 Bob A. Robinson, Rockland, Idaho
 1959 Harry Charters, Melba, Idaho
 1958 Jim Bynum, Forreston, Texas
 1957 Willard Combs, Checotah, Oklahoma
 1956 Harley May, Oakdale, California
 1955 Benny Combs, Checotah, Oklahoma
 1954 Jim Bynum, Forreston, Texas
 1953 Ross Dollarhide, Lakeview, Oregon
 1952 Harley May, Oakdale, California
 1951 Dub Phillips, San Angelo, Texas
 1950 Bill Linderman, Red Lodge, Montana
 1949 Bill McGuire, Fort Worth, Texas
 1948 Homer Pettigrew, Grady, New Mexico
 1947 Todd Whatley, Hugo, Oklahoma
 1946 Dave Campbell, Las Vegas, Nevada
 1945 Homer Pettigrew, Grady, New Mexico
 1944 Homer Pettigrew, Grady, New Mexico
 1943 Homer Pettigrew, Grady, New Mexico
 1942 Homer Pettigrew, Grady, New Mexico
 1941 Hub Whiteman, Clarksville, Texas
 1940 Homer Pettigrew, Grady, New Mexico
 1939 Harry Hart, Pocatello, Idaho
 1938 Everett Bowman, Hillside, Arizona
 1937 Gene Ross, Sayre, Oklahoma
 1936 Jack Kerschner, Miles City, Montana
 1935 Everett Bowman, Hillside, Arizona
 1934 Shorty Ricker, Ranger, Texas
 1933 Everett Bowman, Hillside, Arizona
 1932 Hugh Bennett, Fort Thomas, Arizona
 1931 Gene Ross, Sayre, Oklahoma
 1930 Everett Bowman, Hillside, Arizona
 1929 Gene Ross, Sayre, Oklahoma
Source:

Team Roping Champions 
From 1929 to 1994 either the header or the heeler could win the gold buckle. As of 1995 both the best team wins a gold buckle, one for each roper, header and heeler. The buckles now read, "World Champion Header" or "World Champion Heeler."
 2022 Kaleb Driggers (header), Hoboken, Georgia
 2022 Junior Noguiera (heeler), Presidente Prudente, São Paulo, Brazil
 2021 Kaleb Driggers (header), Hoboken, Georgia
 2021 Junior Noguiera (heeler), Presidente Prudente, São Paulo, Brazil  
 2020 Colby Lovell (header), Madisonville, Texas
 2020 Paul Eaves (heeler), Lonedell, Missouri
 2019 Clay Smith (header), Broken Bow, Oklahoma
 2019 Wesley Thorp (heeler), Throckmorton, Texas
 2018 Clay Smith (header), Broken Bow, Oklahoma
 2018 Paul Eaves (heeler), Millsap, Texas
 2017 Erich Rogers (header), Round Rock, Arizona
 2017 Cory Petska (heeler), Marana, Arizona
 2016 Levi Simpson (header), Ponoka, Alberta, Canada
 2016 Jeremy Buhler (heeler), Arrowwood, Alberta, Canada
 2015 Aaron Tsinigine (header), Tuba City, Arizona
 2015 Kollin VonAhn (heeler), Blanchard, Oklahoma
 2014 Clay Tryan (header), Billings, Montana
 2014 Jade Corkill (heeler), Fallon, Nevada
 2013 Clay Tryan (header), Billings, Montana
 2013 Jade Corkill (heeler), Fallon, Nevada
 2012 Chad Masters (header), Cedar Hill, Tennessee
 2012 Jade Corkill (heeler), Fallon, Nevada
 2011 Turtle Powell (header), Stephenville, Texas
 2011 Jhett Johnson (heeler), Casper, Wyoming
 2010 Trevor Brazile (header), Decatur, Texas
 2010 Patrick Smith (heeler), Midland, Texas
 2009 Nick Sartain (header), Yukon, Oklahoma
 2009 Kollin VonAhn (heeler), Durant, Oklahoma
 2008 Matt Sherwood (header), Pima, Arizona
 2008 Randon Adams (heeler), Logandale, Nevada
 2007 Chad Masters (header), Clarksville, Tennessee
 2007 Walt Woodard (header), Stockton, California
 2006 Matt Sherwood (header), Queen Creek, Arizona
 2006 Allen Bach (heeler), Weatherford, Texas
 2005 Clay Tryan (header), Billings, Montana
 2005 Patrick Smith (healer), Midland, Texas
 2004 Speed Williams (header), Llano, Texas
 2004 Rich Skelton (heeler), Llano, Texas
 2003 Speed Williams (header), Amarillo, Texas
 2003 Rich Skelton (heeler), Llano, Texas
 2002 Speed Williams (header), Jacksonville, Florida
 2002 Rich Skelton (heeler), Llano, Texas
 2001 Speed Williams (header), Jacksonville, Florida
 2001 Rich Skelton (heeler), Llano, Texas
 2000 Speed Williams (header), Jacksonville, Florida
 2000 Rich Skelton (heeler), Llano, Texas
 1999 Speed Williams (header), Jacksonville, Florida
 1999 Rich Skelton (heeler), Llano, Texas
 1998 Speed Williams (header), Jacksonville, Florida
 1998 Rich Skelton (heeler), Llano, Texas
 1997 Speed Williams (header), Jacksonville, Florida
 1997 Rich Skelton (heeler), Llano, Texas
 1996 Steve Purcella (header), Hereford, Texas
 1996 Steve Northcott (heeler), Odessa, Texas
 1995 Bobby Hurley (header), Ceres, California
 1995 Allen Bach (heeler), Toltec, Arizona
 1994 Jake Barnes (header), Cave Creek, Arizona
 1994 Clay O'Brien Cooper (heeler), Gilbert, Arizona
 1993 Bobby Hurley, Ceres, California
 1992 Clay O'Brien Cooper, Gilbert, Arizona
 1992 Jake Barnes, Higley, Arizona
 1991 Tee Woolman, Llano, Texas
 1991 Bob Harris, Gillette, Wyoming
 1990 Allen Bach, Merced, California
 1989 Jake Barnes, Bloomfield, New Mexico
 1989 Clay O'Brien Cooper, Chandler Heights, Arizona
 1988 Jake Barnes, Bloomfield, New Mexico
 1988 Clay O'Brien Cooper, Chandler Heights, Arizona
 1987 Jake Barnes, Bloomfield, New Mexico
 1987 Clay O'Brien Cooper, Chandler Heights, Arizona
 1986 Jake Barnes, Bloomfield, New Mexico
 1986 Clay O'Brien Cooper, Chandler Heights, Arizona
 1985 Jake Barnes, Bloomfield, New Mexico
 1985 Clay O'Brien Cooper, Chandler Heights, Arizona
 1984 Dee Pickett, Caldwell, Idaho
 1984 Mike Beers, Rufus, Oregon
 1983 Leo Camarillo, Lockeford, California
 1982 Tee Woolman, Fredonia, Texas
 1981 Walt Woodard, Stockton, California
 1981 Doyle Gellerman, Oakdale, California
 1980 Tee Woolman, Llano, Texas
 1979 Allen Bach, Queen Creek, Arizona
 1978 George Richards, Humboldt, Arizona, 
 1978 Brad Smith, Prescott, Arizona 
 1977 Dennis Motes, Mesa, Arizona
 1977 David Motes, Fresno, California
 1976 Ronnie Rasco, Lakeside, California
 1976 Bucky Bradford, Sylmar, California
 1975 Leo Camarillo, Oakdale, California
 1974 H.P. Evetts, Hanford, California
 1973 Leo Camarillo, Donald, Oregon
 1972 Leo Camarillo, Donald, Oregon
 1971 John Miller, Pawhuska, Oklahoma]]
 1970 John Miller, Pawhuska, Oklahoma
 1969 Jerold Camarillo, Oakdale, California
 1968 Art Arnold, Buckeye, Arizona
 1967 Joe Glenn, Phoenix, Arizona
 1966 Ken Luman, Merced, California
 1965 Jim Rodriguez Jr., Paso Robles, California
 1964 Bill Hamilton, Phoenix, Arizona
 1963 Les Hirdes, Turlock, California
 1962 Jim Rodriguez Jr., Castroville, California
 1961 Al Hooper, Escalon, California
 1960 Jim Rodriguez Jr., Castroville, California
 1959 Jim Rodriguez Jr., Castroville, California
 1958 Ted Ashworth, Phoenix, Arizona
 1957 Dale Smith, Chandler, Arizona
 1956 Dale Smith, Chandler, Arizona
 1955 Vern Castro, Richmond, California
 1954 Eddie Schell, Camp Verde, California
 1953 Ben Johnson, Hollywood, California
 1952 Asbury Schell, Camp Verde, Arizona
 1951 Olan Sims, Madera, California
 1950 Buck Sorrels, Tucson, Arizona
 1949 Ed Yanez, Newhall, California
 1948 Joe Glenn, Douglas, Arizona
 1947 Jim Brister, Lordsburg, New Mexico
 1946 Chuck Sheppard, Phoenix, Arizona
 1945 Ernest Gill, Madera, California
 1944 Murphy Chaney, Shandon, California
 1943 Mark Hull, Stockton, California 
 1942 Vic Castro, Livermore, California
 1942 Vern Castro, Livermore, California
 1941 Jim Hudson, Wilcox, Arizona
 1940 Pete Grubb, Salmon, Idaho
 1939 Asbury Schell, Camp Verde, Arizona
 1938 John Rhodes, Sombrero Butte, Arizona
 1937 Asbury Schell, Camp Verde, Arizona
 1936 John Rhodes, Sombrero Butte, Arizona
 1935 Lawrence Conley, Prescott, Arizona
 1934, Andy Jauregui, Newhall, California
 1933 Roy Adams, Tucson, Arizona
 1932 Ace Gardner, Coolidge, Arizona
 1931 Arthur Beloat, Buckeye, Arizona
 1930 Norman Cowan, Gresham, Oregon
 1929 Charles Maggini, San Jose, California
Source:

Saddle Bronc Riding Champions 
 2022 Zeke Thurston, Big Valley, Alberta, Canada
 2021 Stetson Wright, Milford, Utah
 2020 Ryder Wright, Milford, Utah
 2019 Zeke Thurston, Big Valley, Alberta, Canada
 2018 Wade Sundell, Boxholm, Iowa
 2017 Ryder Wright, Beaver, Utah
 2016 Zeke Thurston, Big Valley, Alberta, Canada
 2015 Jacobs Crawley, Boerne, Texas
 2014 Spencer Wright, Milford, Utah
 2013 Chad Ferley, Oelrichs, South Dakota
 2012 Jesse Wright, Milford, Utah
 2011 Taos Muncy, Corona, New Mexico
 2010 Cody Wright, Milford, Utah
 2009 Jesse Kruse, Great Falls, Montana
 2008 Cody Wright, Milford, Utah
 2007 Taos Muncy, Corona, New Mexico
 2006 Chad Ferley, Oelrichs, South Dakota
 2005 Jeff Willert, Belvidere, South Dakota
 2004 Billy Etbauer, Edmond, Oklahoma
 2003 Dan Mortensen, Billings, Montana
 2002 Glen O'Neill, Didsbury, Alberta, Canada
 2001 Tom Reeves, Eagle Butte, South Dakota
 2000 Billy Etbauer, Edmond, Oklahoma
 1999 Billy Etbauer, Ree Heights, South Dakota
 1998 Dan Mortensen, Manhattan, Montana
 1997 Dan Mortensen, Manhattan, Montana
 1996 Billy Etbauer, Ree Heights, South Dakota
 1995 Dan Mortensen, Manhattan, Montana
 1994 Dan Mortensen, Manhattan, Montana
 1993 Dan Mortensen, Manhattan, Montana
 1992 Billy Etbauer, Ree Heights, South Dakota
 1991 Robert Etbauer, Goodwell, Oklahoma
 1990 Robert Etbauer, Ree Heights, South Dakota
 1989 Clint Johnson, Spearfish, South Dakota
 1988 Clint Johnson, Spearfish, South Dakota
 1987 Clint Johnson, Spearfish, South Dakota
 1986 Bud Munroe, Valley Mills, Texas
 1985 Brad Gjermundson, Marshall, North Dakota
 1984 Brad Gjermundson, Marshall, North Dakota
 1983 Brad Gjermundson, Marshall, North Dakota
 1982 Monty Henson, Mesquite, Texas
 1981 Brad Gjermundson, Marshall, North Dakota
 1980 Clint Johnson, Spearfish, South Dakota
 1979 Bobby Berger, Lexington, Oklahoma
 1978 Joe Marvel, Battle Mountain, Nevada
 1977 J.C. Bonine, Hysham, Montana
 1976 Monty Henson, Mesquite, Texas (tie)
 1976 Mel Hyland, Salmon Arm, British Columbia, Canada (tie)
 1975 Monty Henson, Mesquite, Texas
 1974 John McBeth, Burden, Kansas
 1973 Bill Smith, Cody, Wyoming
 1972 Mel Hyland, Surrey, British Columbia, Canada
 1971 Bill Smith, Cody, Wyoming
 1970 Dennis Reiners, Scottsdale, Arizona
 1969 Bill Smith, Cody, Wyoming
 1968 Shawn Davis, Whitehall, Montana
 1967 Shawn Davis, Whitehall, Montana
 1966 Marty Wood, Bowness, Alberta, Canada
 1965 Shawn Davis, Whitehall, Montana
 1964 Marty Wood, Bowness, Alberta, Canada
 1963 Guy Weeks, Abilene, Texas
 1962 Kenny McLean, Okanagan Falls, British Columbia, Canada 
 1961 Winston Bruce, Calgary, Alberta, Canada
 1960 Enoch Walker, Cody, Wyoming
 1959 Casey Tibbs, Fort Pierre, South Dakota
 1958 Marty Wood, Bowness, Alberta, Canada
 1957 Alvin Nelson, Sentinel Butte, North Dakota
 1956 Deb Copenhaver, Post Falls, Idaho
 1955 Deb Copenhaver, Post Falls, Idaho
 1954 Casey Tibbs, Fort Pierre, South Dakota
 1953 Casey Tibbs, Fort Pierre, South Dakota
 1952 Casey Tibbs, Fort Pierre, South Dakota
 1951 Casey Tibbs, Fort Pierre, South Dakota
 1950 Bill Linderman, Red Lodge, Montana
 1949 Casey Tibbs, Fort Pierre, South Dakota
 1948 Gene Pruett, Tieton, Washington
 1947 Carl Olson, Calgary, Alberta, Canada
 1946 Jerry Ambler, Glenwood, Washington
 1945 Bill Linderman, Red Lodge, Montana
 1944 Louis Brooks, Pittsburg, Oklahoma
 1943 Louis Brooks, Pittsburg, Oklahoma
 1942 Doff Aber, Wolf, Wyoming
 1941 Doff Aber, Wolf, Wyoming
 1940 Fitz Truan, Long Beach, California
 1939 Fitz Truan, Long Beach, California
 1938 Burel Mulkey, Salmon, Idaho
 1937 Burel Mulkey, Salmon, Idaho
 1936 Pete Knight, Crossfield, Alberta, Canada
 1935 Pete Knight, Crossfield, Alberta, Canada
 1934 Leonard Ward, Talent, Oregon
 1933 Pete Knight, Crossfield, Alberta, Canada
 1932 Pete Knight, Crossfield, Alberta, Canada
 1931 Earl Thode, Belvidere, South Dakota
 1930 Clay Carr, Visalia, California
 1929 Earl Thode, Belvidere, South Dakota
Source:

Tie-Down Roping Champions 
 2022 Caleb Smidt, Huntsville, Texas
 2021 Caleb Smidt, Huntsville, Texas
 2020 Shad Mayfield, Clovis, New Mexico
 2019 Haven Meged, Miles City, Montana
 2018 Caleb Smidt, Huntsville, Texas
 2017 Marcos Costa, Childress, Texas
 2016 Tyson Durfey, Weatherford, Texas 
 2015 Caleb Smidt, Bellville, Texas 
 2014 Tuf Cooper, Decatur, Texas 
 2013 Shane Hanchey, Sulpher, Louisiana 
 2012 Tuf Cooper, Decatur, Texas 
 2011 Tuf Cooper, Decatur, Texas 
 2010 Trevor Brazile, Decatur, Texas 
 2009 Trevor Brazile, Decatur, Texas 
 2008 Stran Smith, Childress, Texas 
 2007 Trevor Brazile, Decatur, Texas 
 2006 Cody Ohl, Hico, Texas 
 2005 Fred Whitfield, Hockley, Texas
 2004 Monty Lewis, Hereford, Texas 
 2003 Cody Ohl, Stephenville, Texas 
 2002 Fred Whitfield, Hockley, Texas 
 2001 Cody Ohl, Stephenville, Texas 
 2000 Fred Whitfield, Hockley, Texas 
 1999 Fred Whitfield, Hockley, Texas 
 1998 Cody Ohl, Orchard, Texas 
 1997 Cody Ohl, Orchard, Texas 
 1996 Fred Whitfield, Hockley, Texas 
 1995 Fred Whitfield, Hockley, Texas 
 1994 Herbert Theriot, Wiggins, Mississippi 
 1993 Joe Beaver, Huntsville, Texas 
 1992 Joe Beaver, Huntsville, Texas 
 1991 Fred Whitfield, Cypress, Texas 
 1990 Troy Pruitt, Lennox, South Dakota 
 1989 Rabe Rabon, San Antonio, Florida 
 1988 Joe Beaver, Victoria, Texas 
 1987 Joe Beaver, Victoria, Texas 
 1986 Chris Lybbert, Argyle, Texas 
 1985 Joe Beaver, Victoria, Texas
 1984 Roy Cooper, Durant, Oklahoma
 1983 Roy Cooper, Durant, Oklahoma
 1982 Roy Cooper, Durant, Oklahoma
 1981 Roy Cooper, Durant, Oklahoma
 1980 Roy Cooper, Durant, Oklahoma
 1979 Paul Tierney, Rapid City, South Dakota
 1978 Dave Brock, Pueblo, Colorado
 1977 Jim Glastone, Cardston, Alberta, Canada
 1976 Roy Cooper, Durant, Oklahoma
 1975 Jeff Copenhaver, Spokane, Washington
 1974 Tom Ferguson, Miami, Oklahoma
 1973 Ernie Taylor, Hugo, Oklahoma
 1972 Phil Lyne, George West, Texas
 1971 Phil Lyne, George West, Texas
 1970 Junior Garrison, Duncan, Oklahoma
 1969 Dean Oliver, Boise, Idaho
 1968 Glen Franklin, House, New Mexico
 1967 Glen Franklin, House, New Mexico
 1966 Junior Garrison, Marlow, Oklahoma
 1965 Glen Franklin, House, New Mexico
 1964 Dean Oliver, Boise, Idaho
 1963 Dean Oliver, Boise, Idaho
 1962 Dean Oliver, Boise, Idaho
 1961 Dean Oliver, Boise, Idaho
 1960 Dean Oliver, Boise, Idaho
 1959 Jim Bob Altizer, Del Rio, Texas
 1958 Dean Oliver, Boise, Idaho
 1957 Don McLaughlin, Fort Worth, Texas
 1956 Ray Wharton, Bandera, Texas
 1955 Dean Oliver, Boise, Idaho
 1954 Don McLaughlin, Fort Worth, Texas
 1953 Don McLaughlin, Fort Worth, Texas
 1952 Don McLaughlin, Fort Worth, Texas
 1951 Don McLaughlin, Fort Worth, Texas
 1950 Toots Mansfield, Bandera, Texas
 1949 Troy Fort, Lovington, New Mexico
 1948 Toots Mansfield, Bandera, Texas
 1947 Troy Fort, Lovington, New Mexico
 1946 Royce Sewalt, King, Texas
 1945 Toots Mansfield, Bandera, Texas
 1944 Clyde Burk, Comanche, Oklahoma
 1943 Toots Mansfield, Bandera, Texas
 1942 Clyde Burk, Comanche, Oklahoma
 1941 Toots Mansfield, Bandera, Texas
 1940 Toots Mansfield, Bandera, Texas
 1939 Toots Mansfield, Bandera, Texas
 1938 Clyde Burk, Comanche, Oklahoma
 1937 Everett Bowman, Hillside, Arizona
 1936 Clyde Burk, Comanche, Oklahoma
 1935 Everett Bowman, Hillside, Arizona
 1934 Irby Mundy, Shamrock, Texas
 1933 Bill McFarlane, Red Bluff, California
 1932, Richard Merchant, Kirkland, Arizona
 1931 Herb Meyers, Okmulgee, Oklahoma
 1930 Jake McClure, Lovington, New Mexico
 1929 Everett Bowman, Hillside, Arizona
Source:

Steer Roping Champions 
 2022 J. Tom Fisher, Andrews, Texas
 2021 Cole Patterson, Pratt, Kansas
 2020 Trevor Brazile, Decatur, Texas
 2019 Trevor Brazile, Decatur, Texas
 2018 Scott Snedecor, Fredericksburg, Texas
 2017 Scott Snedecor, Fredericksburg, Texas
 2016 Rocky Patterson, Pratt, Kansas
 2015 Trevor Brazile, Decatur, Texas
 2014 Trevor Brazile, Decatur, Texas
 2013 Trevor Brazile, Decatur, Texas
 2012 Rocky Patterson, Pratt, Texas
 2011 Trevor Brazile, Decatur, Texas
 2010 Rocky Patterson, Pratt, Kansas
 2009 Rocky Patterson, Pratt, Kansas
 2008 Scott Snedecor, Uvalde, Texas 
 2007 Trevor Brazile, Decatur, Texas
 2006 Trevor Brazile, Decatur, Texas
 2005 Scott Snedecor, Uvalde, Texas
 2004 Guy Allen, Santa Anna, New Mexico
 2003 Guy Allen, Santa Anna, New Mexico
 2002 Buster Record, Buffalo, Oklahoma
 2001 Guy Allen, Santa Anna, New Mexico
 2000 Guy Allen, Lovington, New Mexico
 1999 Guy Allen, Lovington, New Mexico
 1998 Guy Allen, Lovington, New Mexico
 1997 Guy Allen, Lovington, New Mexico
 1996 Guy Allen, Lovington, New Mexico
 1995 Guy Allen, Lovington, New Mexico
 1994 Guy Allen, Vinita, Oklahoma
 1993 Guy Allen, Vinita, Oklahoma
 1992 Guy Allen, Vinita, Oklahoma
 1991 Guy Allen, Vinita, Oklahoma
 1990 Phil Lyne, Cotulla, Texas
 1989 Guy Allen, Lovington, New Mexico
 1988 Shaun Burchett, Pryor, Oklahoma
 1987 Shaun Burchett, Pryor, Oklahoma
 1986 Jim Davis, Bandera, Texas
 1985 Jim Davis, Bandera, Texas
 1984 Guy Allen, Lovington, New Mexico
 1983 Roy Cooper, Durant, Oklahoma
 1982 Guy Allen, Lovington, New Mexico
 1981 Arnold Felts, Mutual, Oklahoma
 1980 Guy Allen, Santa Anna, New Mexico
 1979 Gary Good, Elida, New Mexico
 1978 Kenny Call, Norman, Oklahoma
 1977 Guy Allen, Santa Anna, Texas
 1976 Charles Good, Elida, New Mexico
 1975 Roy Thompson, Tulia, Texas
 1974 Olin Young, Peralto, New Mexico
 1973 Roy Thompson, Tulia, Texas
 1972 Allen Keller, Olathe, Colorado
 1971 Olin Young, Peralto, New Mexico
 1970 Don McLaughlin, Fort Collins, Colorado
 1969 Walter Arnold, Silverton, Texas
 1968 Sonny Davis, Kenna, New Mexico
 1967 Jim Bob Altizer, Del Rio, Texas
 1966 Sonny Davis, Kenna, New Mexico
 1965 Sonny Wright, Alto, New Mexico
 1964 Sonny Davis, Kenna, New Mexico
 1963 Don McLaughlin, Fort Collins, Colorado
 1962 Everett Shaw, Stonewall, Oklahoma
 1961 Clark McEntire, Kiowa, Oklahoma
 1960 Don McLaughlin, Fort Worth, Texas
 1959 Everett Shaw, Stonewall, Oklahoma
 1958 Clark McEntire, Kiowa, Oklahoma
 1957 Clark McEntire, Kiowa, Oklahoma
 1956 Jim Snively, Pawhuska, Oklahoma
 1955 Shoat Webster, Lenapah, Oklahoma
 1954 Shoat Webster, Lenapah, Oklahoma
 1953 Ike Rude, Buffalo, Oklahoma
 1952 Buddy Neal, Van Horn, California
 1951 Everett Shaw, Stonewall, Oklahoma
 1950 Shoat Webster, Lenapah, Oklahoma
 1949 Shoat Webster, Lenapah, Oklahoma
 1948 Everett Shaw, Stonewall, Oklahoma
 1947 Ike Rude, Buffalo, Oklahoma 
 1946 Everett Shaw, Stonewall, Oklahoma
 1945 Everett Shaw, Stonewall, Oklahoma
 1944 Tom Rhodes, Sombrero Butte, Arizona
 1943 Tom Rhodes, Sombrero Butte, Arizona
 1942 King Merritt, Federal, Wyoming
 1941 Ike Rude, Buffalo, Oklahoma
 1940 Clay Carr, Visalia, California
 1939 Dick Truitt, Stonewall, Oklahoma
 1938 Hugh Bennett, Fort Thomas, Arizona
 1937 Everett Bowman, Hillside, Arizona
 1936 John Bowman, Oakdale, California
 1935 Richard Merchant, Kirkland, Arizona
 1934 John McEntire, Kiowa, Oklahoma
 1933 John Bowman, Oakdale, California
 1932 George Weir, Okmulgee, Oklahoma
 1931 Andy Jauregui, Newhall, California
 1930 Clay Carr, Visalia, California
 1929 Charles Maggini, San Jose, California
Source:

Bull Riding Champions 
 2022 Stetson Wright, Milford, Utah
 2021 Sage Kimzey, Strong City, Oklahoma 
 2020 Stetson Wright, Milford, Utah
 2019 Sage Kimzey, Strong City, Oklahoma
 2018 Sage Kimzey, Strong City, Oklahoma
 2017 Sage Kimzey, Strong City, Oklahoma
 2016 Sage Kimzey, Strong City, Oklahoma
 2015 Sage Kimzey, Strong City, Oklahoma
 2014 Sage Kimzey, Strong City, Oklahoma
 2013 J.W. Harris, May, Texas
 2012 Cody Teel, Kountze, Texas
 2011 Shane Proctor, Grand Coulee, Washington
 2010 J.W. Harris, May, Texas
 2009 J.W. Harris, May, Texas
 2008 J.W. Harris, May, Texas
 2007 Wesley Silcox, Payson, Utah
 2006 B.J. Schumacher, Hillsboro, Wisconsin
 2005 Matt Austin, Wills Point, Texas
 2004 Dustin Elliot, Tecumseh, Nebraska
 2003 Terry Don West, Henryetta, Oklahoma
 2002 Blue Stone, Ogden, Utah
 2001 Blue Stone, Ogden, Utah
 2000 Cody Hancock, Taylor, Arizona
 1999 Mike White, Lake Charles, Louisiana
 1998 Ty Murray, Stephenville, Texas
 1997 Scott Mendes, Weatherford, Texas
 1996 Terry Don West, Henryetta, Oklahoma
 1995 Jerome Davis, Archdale, North Carolina
 1994 Daryl Mills, Pink Mountain, British Columbia, Canada
 1993 Ty Murray, Stephenville, Texas
 1992 Cody Custer, Wickenburg, Arizona 
 1991 Tuff Hedeman, Bowie, Texas
 1990 Jim Sharp, Kermit, Texas 
 1989 Tuff Hedeman, Bowie, Texas
 1988 Jim Sharp, Kermit, Texas
 1987 Lane Frost, Lane, Oklahoma
 1986 Tuff Hedeman, Gainesville, Texas
 1985 Ted Nuce, Manteca, California
 1984 Don Gay, Mesquite, Texas
 1983 Cody Snyder, Redcliff, Alberta, Canada
 1982 Charles Sampson, Los Angeles, California
 1981 Don Gay, Mesquite, Texas
 1980 Don Gay, Mesquite, Texas
 1979 Don Gay, Mesquite, Texas
 1978 Butch Kirby, Alba, Texas
 1977 Don Gay, Mesquite, Texas
 1976 Don Gay, Mesquite, Texas
 1975 Don Gay, Mesquite, Texas
 1974 Don Gay, Mesquite, Texas
 1973 Bobby Steiner, Austin, Texas
 1972 John Quintana, Creswell, Oregon
 1971 Bill Nelson, San Francisco, California
 1970 Gary Leffew, Santa Maria, California
 1969 Doug Brown, Silverton, Oregon
 1968 George Paul, Del Rio, Texas
 1967 Larry Mahan, Brooks, Oregon
 1966 Ronnie Rossen, Broadus, Montana
 1965 Larry Mahan, Brooks, Oregon
 1964 Bob Wegner, Auburn, Washington
 1963 Bill Kornell, Palm Springs, California
 1962 Freckles Brown, Lawton, Oklahoma
 1961 Ronnie Rossen, Broadus, Montana
 1960 Harry Tompkins, Dublin, Texas
 1959 Jim Shoulders, Henryetta, Oklahoma
 1958 Jim Shoulders, Henryetta, Oklahoma
 1957 Jim Shoulders, Henryetta, Oklahoma
 1956 Jim Shoulders, Henryetta, Oklahoma
 1955 Jim Shoulders, Henryetta, Oklahoma
 1954 Jim Shoulders, Henryetta, Oklahoma
 1953 Todd Whatley, Hugo, Oklahoma
 1952 Harry Tompkins, Dublin, Texas
 1951 Jim Shoulders, Henryetta, Oklahoma
 1950 Harry Tompkins, Dublin, Texas
 1949 Harry Tompkins, Dublin, Texas
 1948 Harry Tompkins, Dublin, Texas
 1947 Wag Blesing, Bell, California
 1946 Pee Wee Morris, Custer, South Dakota
 1945 Ken Roberts, Strong City, Kansas
 1944 Ken Roberts, Strong City, Kansas
 1943 Ken Roberts, Strong City, Kansas
 1942 Dick Griffith, Fort Worth Texas
 1941 Dick Griffith, Fort Worth Texas
 1940 Dick Griffith, Fort Worth Texas
 1939 Dick Griffith, Fort Worth Texas
 1938 Kid Fletcher, Hugo, Colorado
 1937 Smoky Snyder, Kimberley, British Columbia, Canada
 1936 Smoky Snyder, Kimberley, British Columbia, Canada
 1935 Smoky Snyder, Kimberley, British Columbia, Canada
 1934 Frank Schneider, Caliente, California
 1933 Frank Schneider, Caliente, California
 1932 (tie) Smoky Snyder, Kimberley, British Columbia, Canada
 1932 (tie) Johnie Schneider, Livermore, California
 1931 Smoky Snyder, Kimberley, British Columbia, Canada
 1930 Johnie Schneider, Livermore, California
 1929 Johnie Schneider, Livermore, California
Source:

WPRA/NFR Barrel Racing Champions 
 2022 Hailey Kinsel
 2021 Jordon Briggs
 2020 Hailey Kinsel
 2019 Hailey Kinsel
 2018 Hailey Kinsel
 2017 Nellie Miller
 2016 Mary Burger
 2015 Callie duPerier
 2014 Fallon Taylor
 2013 Sherry Cervi
 2012 Mary Walker
 2011 Lindsay Sears
 2010 Sherry Cervi
 2009 Brittany Pozzi
 2008 Lindsay Sears
 2007 Kay Blandford (WPRA)
 2007 Brittany Pozzi (PWBR)
 2006 Mary Burger
 2005 Kelly Kaminski
 2004 Kelly Kaminski
 2003 Janae Ward
 2002 Charmayne James
 2001 Janet Stover
 2000 Kappy Allen
 1999 Sherry Cervi
 1998 Kristie Peterson
 1997 Kristie Peterson
 1996 Kristie Peterson
 1995 Sherry Cervi
 1994 Kristie Peterson
 1993 Charmayne James
 1992 Charmayne James
 1991 Charmayne James
 1990 Charmayne James
 1989 Charmayne James
 1988 Charmayne James
 1987 Charmayne James
 1986 Charmayne James
 1985 Charmayne James
 1984 Charmayne James
 1983 Marlene Eddleman
 1982 Jan Hansen Smith
 1981 Lynn McKenzie
 1980 Martha Josey
 1979 Carol Goostree
 1978 Lynn McKenzie
 1977 Jackie Jo Perrin
 1976 Connie Combs Kirby
 1975 Jimmie Gibbs Munroe
 1974 Jeana Day
 1973 Gail Petska
 1972 Gail Petska
 1971 Donna Patterson
 1970 Joyce Burk Loomis
 1969 Missy Long
 1968 Ann Lewis
 1967 Loretta Manual
 1966 Norita Krause Henderson
 1965 Sammy Thurman Brackenbury
 1964 Ardith Bruce
 1963 Loretta Manual
 1962 Sherry Combs Johnson
 1961 Jane Mayo
 1960 Jane Mayo
 1959 Jane Mayo
 1958 Billie McBride
 1957 Billie McBride
 1956 Billie McBride
 1955 Billie McBride
 1954 LaTonne Sewalt
 1953 Wanda Harper Bush
 1952 Wanda Harper Bush
 1951 Margaret Owens
 1950 LaTonne Sewalt
 1949 Amy McGilvray
 1948 Margaret Owens
Source:

Breakaway Roping Champions
 2022 Martha Angelone, Stephenville, Texas 
 2021 Sawyer Gilbert, Buffalo, South Dakota
 2020 Jackie Crawford, Stephenville, Texas

NFR Average Champions

All-Around Average Champions 
 2022 Stetson Wright, Milford, Utah
 2021 Stetson Wright, Milford, Utah, $585,850
 2020 Stetson Wright, Milford, Utah
 2019 Stetson Wright, Milford, Utah
 2018 Trevor Brazile, Decatur, Texas, 335,680
 2017 Tuf Cooper, Weatherford, Texas, 341,560
 2016 Junior Nogueira, Presidente Prudente, São Paulo, Brazil, 231,728
 2015 Trevor Brazile, Decatur, Texas, 518,011
 2014 Trevor Brazile, Decatur, Texas, 191,250
 2013 Trevor Brazile, Decatur, Texas, 170,823
 2012 Trevor Brazile, Decatur, Texas, 82,841
 2011 Trevor Brazile, Decatur, Texas, 106,250
 2010 Trevor Brazile, Decatur, Texas, 211,509
 2009 Josh Peek, Pueblo, Colorado, 113,802
 2008 Trevor Brazile, Decatur, Texas, 149,098
 2007 Trevor Brazile, Decatur, Texas, 139,614
 2006 Joe Beaver, Huntsville, Texas, 127,914
 2005 Ryan Jarrett, Summerville, Georgia, 114,718
 2004 Trevor Brazile, Decatur, Texas, 55,774
 2003 Trevor Brazile, Decatur, Texas, 79,539
 2002 Jesse Bail, Camp Cook, South Dakota, 65,609
 2001 Jesse Bail, Camp Cook, South Dakota, 89,858
 2000 Joe Beaver, Huntsville, Texas, 123,356
 1999 Cody Ohl, Stephenville, Texas, 86,438
 1998 Herbert Theriot, Poplarville, Mississippi, 107,899
 1997 Joe Beaver, Huntsville, Texas, 83,228
 1996 Herbert Theriot, Poplarville, Mississippi, 35,898
 1995 Tee Woolman, Llano, Texas, 31,116
 1994 Ty Murray, Stephenville, Texas, 33,259
 1993 Ty Murray, Stephenville, Texas, 124,821
 1992 Ty Murray, Stephenville, Texas, 86,268
 1991 Ty Murray, Stephenville, Texas, 101,242
 1990 Ty Murray, Stephenville, Texas, 72,818
 1989 Ty Murray, Odessa, Texas, 58,031
 1988 Lewis Feild, Elk Ridge, Utah, 64,724
 1987 Lewis Feild, Elk Ridge, Utah, 75,212
 1986 Lewis Feild, Elk Ridge, Utah, 46,620
 1985 Tee Woolman, Llano, Texas 30,529
 1984 Dee Pickett, Caldwell, Idaho, 30,677
 1983 Roy Cooper, Durant, Oklahoma, 27,653
 1982 Jimmie Cooper, Monument, New Mexico, 29,268
 1981 Jimmie Cooper, Monument, New Mexico, 19,500
 1980 Lyle Sankey, Branson, Missouri, 20,000
 1979 Tom Ferguson, Miami, Oklahoma, 10,535
 1978 Tom Ferguson, Miami, Oklahoma, 20,000
 1977 Tom Ferguson, Miami, Oklahoma, 10,749
 1976 Tom Ferguson, Miami, Oklahoma, 9,005
 1975 Sandy Kirby, Greenville, Texas, 4,955
 1974 Tom Ferguson, Miami, Oklahoma, 3,038
 1973 Larry Mahan, Dallas, Texas, 6,575
 1972 Phil Lyne, George West, Texas, 6,897
 1971 Bobby Berger, Norman, Oklahoma, 4,019
 1970 Larry Mahan, Brookes, Oregon, 2,887
 1969 Larry Mahan, Salem, Oregon, 3,303
 1968 Larry Mahan, Salem, Oregon, 2,462
 1967 Larry Mahan, Brooks, Oregon, 3,885
 1966 Dean Oliver, Boise, Idaho, 2,252
 1965 Ken Stanton, Weiser, Idaho, 1,865
 1964 Jim Bob Altizer, Del Rio, Texas, 2,341
 1963 Sonny Worrell, Altoona, Kansas, 1,562
 1962 Harley May, Oakdale, California, 2,326
 1961 Benny Reynolds, Melrose, Montana, 2,610
 1960 Don McLaughlin, Fort Worth, Texas, 3,172
 1959 Jim Shoulders, Henryetta, Oklahoma, 3,478
Source:

Bareback Riding NFR Average Winners 
 2022 Jess Pope, Waverly, Kansas, 860 10
 2021 Jess Pope, Waverly, Kansas, 873 10
 2020 Jess Pope, Waverly, Kansas, 853 10
2019 Clayton Biglow, *886.5 10
 2018 (tie) Tim O'Connell, Zwingle, Iowa, 849.5 10
 2018 (tie) Steven Dent 849.5 10
 2017 Tim O'Connell, Zwingle, Iowa, 835.5 10
 2016 Tim O'Connell, Zwingle, Iowa, 842 10
 2015 Steven Peebles, Redmond, Oregon, 832.5 10
 2014 Kaycee Feild, Spanish Fork, Utah, 818.5 10
 2013 Kaycee Feild, Spanish Fork, Utah 823 10
 2012 Kaycee Feild, Spanish Fork, Utah 834 10
 2011 Kaycee Feild, Payson, Utah, 860.5 10
 2010 Justin McDaniel, Porum, Oklahoma, 836.5 10
 2009 Bobby Mote, Culver, Oregon, 847 10
 2008 Justin McDaniel, Porum, Oklahoma, 859 10
 2007 Will Lowe, Canyon, Texas, 845 10
 2006 Will Lowe, Canyon, Texas 821.5 10
 2005 (tie) Kelly Timberman, Mills Wyoming 837.5 10
 2005 (tie) Cimmaron Gerke, Fort Worth, Texas, 837.5 10
 2004 Kelly Timberman, Mills, Wyoming, 836.5
 2003 Cody Jessee, Pineville, Oregon, 839 10
 2002 Jason Jeter, Fort Worth, Texas, 839 10
 2001 Clint Corey, Powell Butte, Oregon, 811 10
 2000 Jeffrey Collins, Redfield, Kansas, 816 10
 1999 Lan LaJeunesse, Morgan, Utah, 813 10
 1998 Mark Gomes, Hutchinson, Kansas, 786 10
 1997 Eric Mouton, Weatherford, Oklahoma, 796 10
 1996 Mark Garrett, Spearfish, South Dakota, 786 10
 1995 Marvin Garrett, Belle Fourche, South Dakota, 775 10
 1994 Brian Hawke, Azle, Texas, 769 10
 1993 Ty Murray, Stephenville, Texas, 769 10
 1992 Deb Greenough, East Helena, Montana, 783 10
 1991 Wayne Herman, Dickinson, North Dakota, 783 10
 1990 Chuck Logue, Decatur, Texas, 768 10
 1989 Marvin Garrett, Belle Fourche, South Dakota, 775 10
 1988 Dave Appleton, Arlington, Texas, 757 10
 1987 Bruce Ford, Kersey, Colorado, 774 10
 1986 Lewis Feild, Elk Ridge, Utah, 734 10
 1985 Chuck Logue, McKinney, Texas, 752 10
 1984 Lewis Feild, Elk Ridge, Utah, 752 10
 1983 (tie) Larry Peabody, Bozeman, Montana 733 10
 1983 (tie) Danny Brady, Henderson, Nevada, 733 10
 1982 Bruce Ford, Kersey, Colorado, 752 10
 1981 Jimmy Cleveland, Durant, Oklahoma, 765 10
 1980 Bruce Ford, Kersey, Colorado, 730 10
 1979 Bruce Ford, Kersey, Colorado, 719 10
 1978 Mickey Young, Ferron, Utah, 796 11
 1977 No average
 1976 Jack Ward Jr., Odessa, Texas, 710 10
 1975 Jack Ward Jr., Odessa, Texas, 745 10
 1974 Jack Ward Jr., Odessa, Texas, 722 10
 1973 Sandy Kirby, Greenville, Texas, 709 10
 1972 Ace Berry, Modesto, California, 685 10
 1971 Ace Berry, Modesto, California, 684 10
 1970 John Edwards, Red Lodge, Montana, 664 10
 1969 Royce Smith, Iona, Idaho, 597 9
 1968 Jim Houston, Omaha, Nebraska, 611 9
 1967 Clyde Vamvoras, Burkburnett, Texas, 562 9
 1966 Gary Tucker, Carlsbad, New Mexico, 524 8
 1965 Dennis Reiners, Clara City, Minnesota, 476 8
 1964 Jack Buschbom, Mobridge, South Dakota, 464 8
 1963 John Hawkins, Twain Harte, California, 1,409 8
 1962 John Hawkins, Twain Harte, California, 1,403 8
 1961 Jack Buschbom, Mobridge, South Dakota, 1,374 8
 1960 Benny Reynolds, Dillon, Montana, 1,732 10
 1959 Jack Buschbom, Cassville, Wisconsin, 1,790 10
Source: * record

Steer Wrestling NFR Average Champion
 2022 Kyle Irwin, Robertsdale, Alabama, 46.1 10
 2021 Will Lummus, Byhalia, Mississippi, 43 10
 2020 Jacob Edler, Alva, Oklahoma, 43.4 10
 2019 Matt Reeves, Cross Plains, Texas, 48.4 10
 2018 Tyler Waguespack, Gonzales, Mississippi, 44.5 10
 2017 Dakota Eldrige, Elko, Nevada, 45.4 10
 2016 Tyler Waguespack, Gonzales, Mississippi 41.9 10
 2015 Dakota Eldridge, Elko, Nevada, 45.6 10
 2014 Luke Branquinho, Los Alamos, California, 41.6 10
 2013 Bray Armes, Gruver, Texas, 44.8 10
 2012 Les Shepperson, Midwest, Wyoming, 48.6 10
 2011 Luke Branquinho, Los Alamos, California, 41.9 10
 2010 (tie) Dean Gorsuch, Gering, Nebraska, 45.7 10
 2010 (tie) Billy Bugenig, Ferndale, California, 45.7 10
 2009 Lee Graves, Calgary, Alberta, Canada, 45.1 10
 2008 Luke Branquinho, Los Alamos, California, 41.9 10
 2007 Jason Miller, Lance Creek, Wyoming, 42.7 10
 2006 Dean Gorsuch, Gering, Nebraska, 47.8 10
 2005 Lee Graves, Calgary, Alberta, Canada, 39.2 10
 2004 Ronnie Fields, Oklahoma City, Oklahoma, 43.2 10
 2003 Mickey Gee, Wichita Falls, Texas, 47.3 10
 2002 Sid Steiner, Bastrop, Texas, 41.8 10
 2001 Rope Myers, Van, Texas, *37.4 10
 2000 Chad Biesemeyer, Stephenville, Texas, 50.7 10
 1999 Mickey Gee, Wichita Falls, Texas, 42.0 10
 1998 Mike Smith, Baton Rouge, Louisiana, 44.3 10
 1997 Butch Myers, Athens, Texas, 43.3 10
 1996 Mark Roy, Dalemead, Alberta, Canada, 44.8 10
 1995 Rooster Reynolds, Twin Bridges, Montana, 64.3 10
 1994 Blaine Pederson, Amisk, Alberta, Canada, 55.3 10
 1993 Steve Duhon, Opelousas, Louisiana, 49.3 10
 1992 Mark Roy, Dalemead, Alberta, Canada, 58.0 10
 1991 Blaine Pederson, Amisk, Alberta, Canada, 59.1 10
 1990 Ivan Teigen, Camp Cook, South Dakota, 72.2 10
 1989 Marty Melvin, Holabid, South Dakota, 57.7 10
 1988 John W. Jones Jr., Morrow Bay California, 64.1 10
 1987 Steve Duhon, Opelousas, Louisiana, 48.1 10
 1986 Butch Myers, Welda, Kansas, 44.3 10
 1985 Ote Berry, Gordon, Nebraska, 49.3 10
 1984 Roy Duvall, Checotah, Oklahoma, 57.8 10
 1983 Jimmie Cooper, Monument, New Mexico, 78.5 10
 1982 Chris Lybbert, Coyote, California, 78.7 10
 1981 Tom Ferguson, Miami, Oklahoma, 69.5 10
 1980 Paul Hughes, Kim, Colorado, 92.2 10
 1979 Jack Hannum, Ogden, Utah, 87.7 10
 1978 Tom Ferguson, Miami, Oklahoma, 97.5 11
 1977 Tom Ferguson, Miami, Oklahoma, 65.8 10
 1976 Tommy Puryear, Leander, Texas, 87.1 10
 1975 Bob Christophersen, Glendive Montana, 69.0 10
 1974 Bob Marshall, San Martin, California, 82.7 10
 1973 Bob Marshall, San Martin, California, 71.6 10
 1972 Jerry Peveto, Hugo, Oklahoma, 82.8 10
 1971 Bob Christophersen, Sioux City, Iowa, 75.2 10
 1970 John W Jones Sr., Morror Bay, California, 85.8 10
 1969 John W Jones Sr., Morror Bay, California, 60.0 9
 1968 John W Jones Sr., Morror Bay, California, 67.5 9
 1967 Walt Linderman, Belfry, Montana, 70.0 9
 1966 Jack Roddy, San Jose, California, 74.6 8
 1965 John W Jones Sr., Morror Bay, California, 91.0 8
 1964 Billy Hale, Checotah, Oklahoma, 69.2 8
 1963 Billy Hale, Checotah, Oklahoma, 101.6 8
 1962 Mark Schricker, Sutherlin, Oregon, 85.7 8
 1961 C.R. Boucher, Burkburnett, Texas, 81.1 8
 1960 Harley May, Oakdale, California, 79.9 10
 1959 Willard Combs, Checotah, Oklahoma, 111.6 10
Source:
* record

Team Roping NFR Average Champions
 2022 Patrick Smith/Tanner Tomlinson, *53.0 10
 2021 Buddy Hawkins/Andrew Ward, 54.70 10
 2020 Erich Rogers/Paden Bray, 80.2 10
 2019 Cody Snow, Los Olivos, California, 43.80 9
 2019 Wesley Thorp, Throkmorton, Texas, 43.80 9
 2018 Aaron Tsinigine, Tuba City, Arizona 69.6 10
 2018 Trey Yates, Pueblo, Colorado
 2017 Chad Masers, Cedar Hills, Tennessee
 2017 Travis Graves, Jay, Oklahoma, 61.2 10
 2016 Levi Simpson, Ponoka, Alberta, Canada
 2016 Jeremy Buhler, Arrowwood, Alberta, Canada, 54.2 9 10
 2015 Luke Brown, Stephenville, Texas
 2015 Kollin VonAhn, Blanchard, Oklahoma, 65.3 10
 2014 Clay Tryan, Billings, Montana
 2014 Jade Corkill, Fallon, Nevada, 70.1 10
 2013 Luke Brown, Stephenville Texas
 2013 Kollin VonAhn, Blanchard, Oklahoma, 56.2 9 10
 2012 Chad Masters, Cedar Hill, Tennessee
 2012 Clay O'Brien Cooper, Gardenerville, Nevada, 73.4 10
 2011 Turtle Powell, Stephenville, Texas
 2011 Jhett Johnson, Casper, Wyoming, 57.5 9 10
 2010 Luke Brown, Rock Hill, South Carolina, 65.5 10
 2009 Nick Sartain, Yukon, Oklahoma
 2009 Kollin VohAhn, Durant, Oklahoma, 59.2 10
 2008 Trevor Brazile, Decatur, Texas
 2008 Patrick Smith, Midland, Texas, 60.1 10
 2007 Jake Barnes, Scottsdale, Arizona
 2007 Clay O'Brien Cooper, Morgan Mill, Texas, 72.6 10
 2006 Chad Masters, Adams, Tennessee
 2006 Allen Bach, Weatherford, Texas, 88.5 10
 2005 Tee Woolman, Llano, Texas
 2005 Cory Petska, Lexington, Oklahoma, 71.7 10
 2004 Clay Tryan, Billings, Montana
 2004 Michael Jones, Stephenville, Texas, 77.8 10
 2003 Matt Tyler, Dennis, Texas
 2003 Patrick Smith, Midland, Texas, 62.3 10
 2002 J.D. Yates, Pueblo, Colorado
 2002 Bobby Harris, Gillette, Wyoming, 96.6 10
 2001 Speed Williams, Jacksonville, Florida
 2001 Rich Skelton, Llano, Texas, 92.8 10
 2000 Charles Pogue, Ringling, Oklahoma
 2000 Britt Bockius, Claremore, Oklahoma, 73.3 10
 1999 Jimmy Tanner, Tifton, Georgia
 1999 Brad Culpepper, Poulan, Georgia, 83.9 10
 1998 Jimmy Tanner, Tifton, Georgia
 1998 Brad Culpepper, Sylvester, Georgia, 68.0 10
 1997 Bret Boatright, Mulhall, Oklahoma
 1997 Kory Koontz, Sudan, Texas, 83.0 10
 1996 Steve Purcella, Hereford, Texas
 1996 Steve Northcott, Odessa, Texas, 70.9 10
 1995 Kermit Maass, Snook, Texas
 1995 Tyler Magnus, Manor, Texas, 62.9 10
 1994 Jake Barnes, Cave Creek, Arizona
 1994 Clay O'Brien Cooper, Higley, Arizona 59.1 10
 1993 Kevin Stewart, Glen Rose, Texas
 1993 Jacky Stephenson, Charlotte, Texas, 100.5 10
 1992 Mark Simon, Florence, Arizona
 1992 Bret Tonozzi, Fruita, Colorado, 80.8 10
 1991 David Motes, Fresno, California
 1991 Bret Tonozzi, Fruita, Colorado, 85.9 10
 1990 Tee Woolman, Llano, Texas
 1990 Bobby Harris, Gillette, Wyoming, 78.8 10
 1989 Bret Boatright, Conway Springs, Kansas
 1989 Steve Northcott, Odessa, Texas, 78.8 10
 1988 Charles Pogue, Ringling, Oklahoma
 1988 Rickey Green, Burbank, California, 99.7 10
 1987 (tie) Tee Woolman, Llano, Texas
 1987 (tie) Bob Harris, Voca, Texas, 77.2 10
 1987 (tie) Jake Milton, Torrington, Wyoming
 1987 (tie) Walt Woodard, Stockton, California, 77.2
 1986 Paul Petska, Carlsbad, New Mexico
 1986 Monty Joe Petska, Carlsbad, New Mexico, 90.2 10
 1985 Jake Barnes, Bloomfield, New Mexico
 1985 David Motes, Fresno, California
 1985 Clay O'Brien Cooper, Chandler Heights, Arizona, 87.8 10
 1984 David Motes, Fresno, California
 1984 Dennis Watkins, Taft, California, 82.4 10
 1983 Jake Milton, Torrington, Wyoming
 1983 Lee Woodbury, Nampa, Idaho, 99.2 10
 1982 Tee Woolman, Fredonia, Texas
 1982 Leo Camarillo, Lockeford, California, 80.8
 1981 David Motes, Fresno, California
 1981 Dennis Watkins, Chowchilla, California, 91.6
 1980 Tee Woolman, Llano, Texas
 1980 Leo Camarillo, Lockeford, California, 98.7 10
 1979 Jesse James, Porterville, California
 1979 Allen Bach, Queen Creek, Arizona, 107.5 10
 1978 George Richards, Humboldt, Arizona
 1978 Brad Smith, Prescott, Arizona, 105.8 11
 1977 David Motes, Fresno, California
 1977 Dennis Motes, Mesa, Arizona, 94.6 10
 1976 Doyle Gellerman, Oakdale, California
 1976 Frank Ferreira Sr., Fresno, California, 102.2 10
 1975 Reg Camarillo, Oakdale, California
 1975 Jerold Camarillo, Oakdale, California, 106.7 10
 1974 Jim Wheatley, Hughson, California
 1974 John Bill Rodriguez, Castroville, California, 104.3 10
 1973 Jim Rodriguez Jr., Paso Robles, California
 1973 Ken Luman, Visalia, California, 100.4 10
 1972 John J. Miller, Pawhuska, Oklahoma
 1972 Ace Berry, Modesto, California, 124.7 10
 1971 Reg Camarillo, Mesa, Arizona
 1971 Leo Camarillo, Donald, Oregon, 154.5 10
 1970 Reg Camarillo, Mesa, Arizona
 1970 Leo Camarillo, Donald, Oregon, 126.9 10
 1969 Reg Camarillo, Mesa, Arizona
 1969 Leo Camarillo, Donald, Oregon, 115.6 9
 1968 Billy Wilson, Arroyo Grande, California
 1968 Leo Camarillo, Donald, Oregon, 104.6 9
 1967 Bucky Bradford Jr., Tuczon, Arizona
 1967 Ace Berry, Modesto, California, 141.7 9
 1966 Jim Rodriguez Jr., Paso Robles, California
 1966 Ken Luman, Merced, California 116.2 8
 1965 Billy Darnell, Rodeo, New Mexico
 1965 Bronc Curry, Thousand Oaks, California 100.6 8
 1964 Byron Gist, Lakeside, California
 1964 Gary Gist, Lakeside, California, 114.2 8
 1963 Les Hirdes, Turlock, California
 1963 Al Hooper, Reno, Nevada, 100.9 8
 1962 Les Hirdes, Turlock California
 1962 Julius Boschi, Patterson, California, 134.5 8
 1961 Sam Edmondson, Fresno, California
 1961 R.D. Rutledge, Tulare, California, 124.1 8
 1960 Jim Rodriguez Jr., San Luis Obispo, California
 1960 Gene Rambo, Shandon, California 134.8 8
 1959 Jim Rodriguez Jr., San Luis Obispo, California
 1959 Gene Rambo, Shando, California 121.8 6
Source:
* record

Saddle Bronc Riding NFR Average Champions 
 2022 Zeke Thurston, Big Valley Alberta, Canada, *876.5 10
 2021 Brody Cress, Hillsdale, Wyoming, 859 10
 2020 Ryder Wright, Milford, Utah, *876.5 10
 2019 Brody Cress, Hillsdale, Wyoming, 840.5 10
 2018 CoBurn Bradshaw 848.5 10
 2017 Brody Cress, Hillsdale, Wyoming, 841.5 10
 2016 Zeke Thurston, Big Valley, Alberta, Canada 747.5 9
 2015 Jacobs Crawley, Boerne, Texas, 810.5 10
 2014 Spencer Wright, Milford, Utah, 807.5 10
 2013 Jacobs Crawley, Stephenville, Texas, 778.5 10
 2012 Cody DeMoss, Heflin, Louisiana, 798.5 10
 2011 Jesse Wright, Milford, Utah, 848.5 10
 2010 Cody Wright, Milford, Utah, 847 10
 2009 Shaun Stroh, Dickinson, North Dakota, 732.5 9/10
 2008 Cody Taton, Newell, South Dakota, 720.5 9/10
 2007 Rod Hay, Wildwood, Alberta, Canada, 826 10
 2006 J.J. Elshere, Quinn, South Dakota, 723 9/10
 2005 Rod Warren, Big Valley, Alberta, Canada, 798 10
 2004 Rod Warren, Big Valley, Alberta, Canada, 757.5 10
 2003 Rod Warren, Big Valley, Alberta, Canada, 805 10
 2002 Glen O'Neill, Didsbury, Alberta, Canada, 825 10
 2001 Scott Johnson, Gustine, Texas, 719 9/10
 2000 Ryan Mapston, Geyser, Montana, 721 9/10
 1999 Charley Gardner, Ruby Valley, Montana, 757 10
 1998 Rod Warren, Water Valley, 755, 10
 1997 Scott Johnson, DeLeon, Texas, 781 10
 1996 Billy Etbauer, Ree Heights, South Dakota, 805 10
 1995 Robert Etbauer, Goodwell, Oklahoma, 750 10
 1994 Dan Mortensen, Manhattan, Montana, 791 10
 1993 Tom Reeves, Stephenville, Texas, 725, 10
 1992 Billy Etbauer, Ree Heights, South Dakota, 714 9/10
 1991 Robert Etbauer, Goodwell, Oklahoma, 766 10
 1990 Bud Longbrake, Dupree, South Dakota, 752 10
 1989 Clint Johnson, Spearfish, South Dakota, 746 10
 1988 Brad Gjermundson, Marshall, North Dakota, 746 10
 1987 Butch Knowles, Hermiston, Oregon, 728 10
 1986 Dave Appleton, Arlington, Texas, 698 10
 1985 (tie) Bud Pauley, Shepherd, Montana, 728 10
 1985 (tie) Monty Henson, Mesquite, Texas, 728 10
 1984 Monty Henson, Mesquite, Texas, 755 10
 1983 Brad Gjermundson, Marshall, North Dakota, 742 10
 1982 Monty Henson, Mesquite, Texas, 657 9/10
 1981 Tom Miller, Faith, South Dakota, 719 10
 1980 Bobby Berger, Lexington, Oklahoma, 705 10
 1979 Tom Miller, Faith, South Dakota, 723 10
 1978 Joe Marvel, Battle Mountain, Nevada, 844 11
 1977 No average
 1976 Monty Henson, Mesquite, Texas, 717 10
 1975 Tom Miller, Faith, South Dakota, 734 10
 1974 Joe Marvel, Battle Mountain, Nevada, 725 10
 1973 Dennis Reiners, Scottsdale, Arizona 703 10
 1972 Marvin Joyce, East Helena, Montana, 644 10
 1971 Kenny McLean, Okanagan Falls, British Columbia, Canada, 662 10
 1970 Ivan Daines, Innisfail, Alberta, Canada, 687 10
 1969 Buzz Seely, Roosevelt, Washington, 584 9
 1968 Kenny McLean, Okanagan Falls, British Columbia, Canada, 586 9
 1967 Larry Mahan, Brooks, Oregon, 578 9
 1966 Marty Wood, Bowness, Alberta, Canada, 528 8
 1965 Bill Martinelli, Oakdale, California, 542 8
 1964 Kenny McLean, Okanagan Falls, British Columbia, Canada, 473 8
 1963 Jim Tescher, Medora, North Dakota, 1,414 8
 1962 Alvin Nelson, Sidney, Montana, 1,401 8
 1961 Alvin Nelson, Sidney, Montana, 1,390 8
 1960 Enoch Walker, Cody, Wyoming, 1,789 10
 1959 Jim Tescher, Medora, North Dakota, 1,806 10
Source:
* record

NFSR Steer Roping Average Champions 
 2022 Cody Lee, Marana, Arizona, 123.3 10
 2021 Cole Patterson, Pratt, Kansas, 97.7 9
 2020 Trevor Brazile, Decatur, Texas, 124.5 10
 2019 Trevor Brazile, Decatur, Texas, 131 0 10
 2018 Cody Lee, Gatesville, Texas, 132 0 10
 2017 Scott Snedecor, Fredericksburg, Texas, 104 1 9
 2016 Cody Lee, Gatesville, Texas, 125.9 10
 2015 Trevor Brazile, Decatur, Texas, *113.3 10
 2014 Trevor Brazile, Decatur, Texas, 114.1 10
 2013 Tony Reina, Whaton, Texas, 142.2 10
 2012 Trevor Brazile, Decatur, Texas, 131.7 10
 2011 Scott Snedecor, Fredericksburg, Texas, 172.8 10
 2010 Cody Scheck, Kiowa, Kansas, 171.1 10
 2009 Bryce Davis, Kiowa, Kansas, 137.9 10
 2008 J.D. Yates, Pueblo, Colorado, 148.2 10
 2007 Jarrett Blessing, Paradise, Texas, 127.5 10
 2006 J.R. Olson, Sheridan, Wyoming, 127.0 9
 2005 Scott Snedecor, Uvalde, Texas, 123.4 10
 2004 Guy Allen, Santa Anna, Texas, 128.2 10
 2003 Ora Taton, Rapid City, South Dakota, 159.9 10
 2002 Chet Herren, Pawhuska, Oklahoma, 223.2 10
 2001 Rocky Patterson, Pratt, Kansas, 114.5 10
 2000 Guy Allen, Lovington, New Mexico, 139.3 10
 1999 Rocky Patterson, Pratt, Kansas, 146.7 10
 1998 Tee Woolman, Llano, Texas, 168.7 10
 1997 Guy Allen, Lovington, New Mexico, 136.2 10
 1996 Roy Cooper, Childress, Texas, 131.5 10
 1995 Arnold Felts, Sonora, Texas, 148.8 10
 1994 Arnold Felts, Sonora, Texas, 159.4 10
 1993 Roy Cooper, Childress, Texas, 147.8 10
 1992 Arnold Felts, Sonora, Texas, 172.8 10
 1991 Guy Allen, Vinita, Oklahoma, 160.8 10
 1990 Neil Worrell, Fredonia, Kansas, 175.2
 1989 Guy Allen, Lovington, New Mexico, 144.2 10
 1988 Jim Davis, Bandera, Texas, 155 10
 1987 Rod Pratt, Sharon Springs, Kansas, 148.6 10
 1986 Phil Lyne, Cotulla, Texas, 184.8 10
 1985 Roy Cooper, Durant, Oklahoma, 153.2 10
 1984 Roy Cooper, Durant, Oklahoma, 146.7 10
 1983 Phil Lyne, Cotulla, Texas, 176.7 10
 1982 Wade Lewis, Hereford, Texas, 222.8 10
 1981 Terry McGinley, Keystone, Nebraska, 194.4 10
 1980 Terry McGinley, Keystone, Nebraska, 200.4 10
 1979 Gary Good, Elida, New Mexico, 208.3 10
 1978 Walt Arnold, Silverton, Texas, 228.2 10
 1977 Olin Young, Peralta, New Mexico, 204 10
 1976 Charles Good, Elida, New Mexico, 182.2 10
 1975 Dewey Lee David, Riverton, Wyoming, 150.8 8
 1974 Olin Young, Peralta, New Mexico, 149.1 8
 1973 Eddie Becker, Ashby, Nebraska, 197.7 8
 1972 Joe Snively, Sedan, Kansas, 131.7 6
 1971 James Allen, Santa Anna, Texas, 117.1 6
 1970 Dewey Lee David, Riverton, Wyoming, 214.5
 1969 Tim Prather, Post, Texas, 125.5 6
 1968 Sonny Davis, Kenna, New Mexico, 120.8 6
 1967 Olin Young, Peralta, New Mexico, 127.5 6
 1966 Kelly Corbin, Delaware, Oklahoma, 108.1 6
 1965 Walt Arnold, Silverton, Texas, 124.4 6
 1964 Don McLaughlin, Fort Collins, Colorado, 178.2 6
 1963 Glen Nutter, Thedford, Nebraska, 114.9 6
 1962 Everett Shaw, Stonewall, Oklahoma, 124.3 6
 1961 Joe Snively Sr., Pawhuska, Oklahoma, 145.6 6
 1960 Don McLaughlin, Fort Collins, Colorado, 125.2 6
 1959 Jim Snively Sr., Pawhuska, Oklahoma, 170.4 6
Source:
* record

Tie-Down Roping NFR Average Champions
 2022 Caleb Smidt, Huntsville, Texas 82.5 10
 2021 Caleb Smidt, Huntsville, Texas 83.1 10
 2020 Shane Hanchey, Sulphur, Louisiana, 83.1/10
 2019 Haven Meged, Miles City, Montana, 85.7/10
 2018 Caleb Smidt, Bellville, Texas, 83.7 10
 2017 Marcos Costa, Childress, Texas 81.3 10
 2016 Riley Pruitt, Gering Nebraska, 85.9 10
 2015 Caleb Smidt, Bellville, Texas, 80.7 10
 2014 Tuf Cooper, Decatur, Texas, 89.7 10
 2013 Shane Hanchey, Sulpher, Louisiana, *80.1 10
 2012 Adam Gray, Seymour, Texas, 87.8 10
 2011 Matt Shiozawa, Chubbuck, Idaho, 88.6 10
 2010 Trevor Brazile, Decatur, Texas, 88.6 10
 2009 Tuf Cooper, Decatur, Texas, 84.5 10
 2008 Stran Smith, Childress, Texas, 87.1 10
 2007 Cody Ohl, Hico, Texas, 90.8 10
 2006 Cody Ohl, Hico, Texas, 84.3 10
 2005 Ryan Jarrett, Summerville, Georgia, 89.0 10
 2004 Monty Lewis, Hereford, Texas, 87.8 10
 2003 Mike Johnson, Henryetta, Oklahoma, 86.4 10
 2002 Fred Whitfield, Hockley, Texas, 88.8 10
 2001 Jerome Schneeberger, Ponca City, Oklahoma, 109.6 10
 2000 Brent Lewis, Pinon, New Mexico, 86.9 10
 1999 Fred Whitfield, Hockley, Texas, 84.0 10
 1998 Cody Ohl, Stephenville, Texas, 91.6 10
 1997 Fred Whitfield, Hockley, Texas 84.0 10
 1996 Joe Beaver, Huntsville, Texas, 101.9 10
 1995 Roy Cooper, Childress, Texas, 101.8 10
 1994 Tod Sloane, Canyon Lake, 99.5 10
 1993 Troy Pruitt, Minatare, Nebraska, 96.4
 1992 Joe Beaver, Huntsville, Texas, 96.8 10
 1991 Fred Whitfield, Cypress, Texas, 91.7 10
 1990 Herbert Theriot, Wiggins, Mississippi, 106.8 10
 1989 David Bowen, Yoakum, Texas, 110.6 10
 1988 Joe Beaver, Victoria, Texas, 117.1 10
 1987 Joe Beaver, Victoria, Texas, 112.3
 1986 D.R. Daniel, Okeechobee, Florida, 102.6 10
 1985 Mike McLaughin, Fort Worth, Texas, 102.6 10
 1984 Dee Pickett, Caldwell, Idaho, 114.9
 1983 Roy Cooper, Durant, Oklahoma, 109.1 10
 1982 Mike McLaughlin, Saginaw, Texas, 122.2 10
 1981 Chris Lybbert, Coyote, California, 113.4 10
 1980 Chris Lybbert, Coyote, California, 123.5 10
 1979 Roy Cooper, Durant, Oklahoma, 107.9 10
 1978 Gary Ledford, Comanche, Oklahoma, 134.9 11
 1977 Jim Gladstone, Cardstone, Alberta, Canada, 119.7 10
 1976 Roy Cooper, Durant, Oklahoma, 133.4 10
 1975 Bobby Goodspeed, High Ridge, Missouri, 140.6 10
 1974 Ronnye Sewalt, Chico, Texas, 137.6 10
 1973 Barry Burk, Duncan, Oklahoma, 144.8
 1972 Phil Lyne, George West, Texas, 129.7 10
 1971 Olin Young, Peralta, New Mexico, 139.6 10
 1970 Richard Stowers, Duncan, Oklahoma, 134.7 10
 1969 Mark Schricker, Sutherlin, Oregon, 125 9
 1968 Junior Garrison, Marlow, Oklahoma, 128.6 9
 1967 Glen Franklin, House, New Mexico, 131.4 9
 1966 Lee Cocrell, Panhandle, Texas, 124.5 8
 1965 Jim Bob Altizer, Del Rio, Texas, 114.6 8
 1964 Jim Bob Altizer, Del Rio, Texas, 1203 8
 1963 Olin Young, Albuquerque, New Mexico, 112.6 8
 1962 Olin Young, Albuquerque, New Mexico, 122.1 8
 1961 Dean Oliver, Boise, Idaho, 124 8
 1960 Don McLaughlin, Fort Collins, Colorado, 161.6 10
 1559 Olin Young, Albuquerque, New Mexico, 191.3 10
Source:

Bull Riding NFR Average Champions
 2022 Stetson Wright, Milford, Utah, 684.5 8/10
 2021 Josh Frost, Randlett, Utah, 568.5 7/10
 2020 Colten Fritzlan, Rifle, Colorado, 605 7/10
 2019 Sage Kimzey, Strong City, Oklahoma 709 8/10
 2018 Chase Dougherty, Canby, Oregon, 603.5 7/10 
 2017 Sage Kimzey, Strong City, Oklahoma, 601.5 7/10
 2016 Shane Proctor, Grand Coulee, Washington, 590 7/10
 2015 Cody Teel, Kountze, Texas, 590 7/10
 2014 Sage Kimzey, Strong City, Oklahoma, 671 8/10
 2013 Cody Teel, Kountze, Texas, 651.5 8/10
 2012 Beau Schroeder, China, Texas, 423 5/10
 2011 L.J. Jenkins, Porum, Oklahoma, 501 6/10
 2010 J.W. Harris, Mullin, Texas, 714 8/10
 2009 Kanin Asay, Powell, Wyoming, 434 5/10
 2008 J.W. Harris, May, Texas, 507 6/10
 2007 Wesley Silcox, Payson, Utah, 596 7/10
 2006 B.J. Schumacher, Hillsboro, Wisconsin, 696.6 8/10
 2005 Matt Austin, Wills Point, Texas, 586.5 7/10
 2004 Paulo Crimber, Haltom City, Texas, 500.5 6/10
 2003 Greg Potter, Whitt, Texas, 502.5 6/10
 2002 Blue Stone, Ogden, Utah, 520 6/10
 2001 Blue Stone, Ogden, Utah, 693 8/10
 2000 Philip Elkins, Keller, Texas, 665 8/10
 1999 Mike White, Big Spring, Texas, 518 6/10
 1998 Ty Murray, Stephenville, Texas, 491 6/10
 1997 Scott Mendes, Weatherford, Texas, 557 7/10
 1996 Adriano Moraes, Keller, Texas, 724 9/10
 1995 Jerome Davis, Archdale, North Carolina, 736, 9/10
 1994 Adriano Moraes, Keller, Texas, 773 10/10
 1993 Daryl Mills, Pink Mountain, British Columbia, Canada, 650 8/10
 1992 Jim Sharp, Stephenville, Texas, 570 7/10
 1991 Michael Gaffney, Lubbock, Texas, 701 9/10
 1990 Norman Curry, DeBerry, Texas, *800 10/10
 1989 (tie) Tuff Hedeman, Bowie, Texas, 709 9/10
 1989 (tie) Jim Sharp, Kermit, Texas, 709 9/10
 1988 Jim Sharp, Kermit, Texas, 771 10/10
 1987 Tuff Hedeman, Bowie, Texas
 1986 Lane Frost, Lane, Oklahoma, 678 8/10
 1985 Ted Nuce, Manteca, California, 697 9/10
 1984 Glen McIlvain, Mesquite, Texas, 630 8/10
 1983 Rickey Lindsey, Huntsville, Texas, 625 8/10
 1982 Denny Flynn, Charleston, Arkansas, 538 7/10
 1981 Denny Flynn, Charleston, Arkansas, 700 9/10
 1980 Lyle Sankey, Branson, Missouri, 695 9/10
 1979 John Davis, Homedale, Idaho, 641 8/10
 1978 Lyle Sankey, Augusta, Kansas, 688 9/11
 1977 No average
 1976 Don Gay, Mesquite, Texas, 558 7/10
 1975 Denny Flynn, Springdale, Arkansas, 631 9/10
 1974 Sandy Kirby, Greenville, Texas, 540 8/10
 1973 Marvin Paul Shoulders, Henryetta, Oklahoma, 747 9/10
 1972 Phil Lyne, George West, Texas, 637 9/10
 1971 Bob Berger, Norman, Oklahoma, 648 9/10
 1970 Gary Leffew, Santa Maria California, 594 9/10
 1969 Bobby Berger, Halstead, Kansas, 594 8/9
 1968 George Paul, Del Rio, Texas 615 8/9
 1967 Freckles Brown, Soper, Oklahoma, 480 7/9
 1966 Bob Wegner, Auburn, Washington, 404 6/8
 1965 Ron Rossen, Broadus, Montana, 447 7/8
 1964 (tie) Bob Wegner, Auburn, Washington, 359 6/8
 1964 (tie) Ron Rossen, Broadus, Montana, 359 6/8
 1963 Leo Brow, Czar, Alberta, Canada, 1,384 8/8
 1962 Bob Robinson, Porterville, California, 1,014 6/8
 1961 Bernis Johnson, Cleburne, Texas, 1,197 7/8
 1960 Duane Howard, Minnewaukan, North Dakota, 1,416 8/10
 1959 Jim Shoulders, Henryetta, Oklahoma, 1,611 9/10
Source:
* record

Barrel Racing NFR Average Champions 
 2022 Shelley Morgan, 137.28/10
 2021 Jordon Briggs, 136.83/10 
 2020 Hailey Kinsel, 170.95/10
 2019 Ivy Conrado, 138.44/10
 2018 Carman Pozzobon, 139.46 10
 2017 Nellie Miller, 137.32
 2016 Lisa Lockhart 137.98 seconds**
 2015 Callie duPerier 140.41
 2014 Lisa Lockhart 144.93
 2013 Sherry Cervi 138.15
 2012 Brenda Mays 141.79
 2011 Lindsay Sears 139.50
 2010 Jill Moody 138.26
 2009 Sherry Cervi 139.01
 2008 Jill Moody 140.11
 2007 Brittany Pozzi 140.18
 2006 Brittany Pozzi 141.12
 2005 Liz Pinkston 142.65
 2004 Molly Powell 140.93
 2003 Janae Ward 140.50
 2002 Charmayne James 141.75
 2001  Kappy Allen 142.20
 2000* Kappy Allen 140.01
 1999* Sherry Cervi 141.56
 1998* Kristie Peterson 141.58
 1997 Kristie Peterson 143.28
 1996 Kristie Peterson 141.89
 1995 Kristie Peterson 142.22
 1994 Kristie Peterson 143.83
 1993 Charmayne James 145.14
 1992 Vana Beissinger 143.33
 1991 Kim West 144.01
 1990 Charmayne James 145.39
 1989 Charmayne James 146.33
 1988 Marlene McRae 142.85
 1987 Charmayne James 143.51
 1986* Charmayne James 138.93
 1985 Janet Powell 145.38
 1984 Charmayne James
 1983 Marlene Eddleman McRae
 1982 Paula Fortner Barthle
 1981 Donna Krening
 1980 Donna Kreming
 1978 Lynn McKenzie
 1977 Jackie Jo Perrin
 1976 Connie Combs Kirby
 1975 Connie Combs Kirby
 1974 Colette Grave Baier
 1973 Becky Carson
 1972 Gail Petska
 1971 Donna Patterson
 1970 Joyce Burk Loomis
 1969 Missy Long
 1968 Kathie O'Brien
 1967 Frances Smith
 1966 Allene Gaylor Mourne
 1965 Pat Marr
 1964 Allene Gaylor Mourne
 1963 Sis Armstrong
 1962 Sissy Thurman
 1961 Boots Tucker
 1960 Jane Mayo
 1959 Jane Mayo
Source:
*different pattern

Breakaway Roping NFBR Average Champions 
 2022 Cadee Williams, Weatherford, Texas, 31.9 10
 2021 Sawyer Gilbert, Buffalo, South Dakota, 46.3 10

Other champions and awards

Xtreme Bulls Tour Champions

Source:

Stock Contractor of the Year 
 2022 Frontier Rodeo
 2021 Frontier Rodeo 
 2020 Frontier Rodeo
 2019 Frontier Rodeo
 2018 Frontier Rodeo
 2017 Frontier Rodeo
 2016 Frontier Rodeo
 2015 Frontier Rodeo
 2014 Stace Smith
 2013 Stace Smith
 2012 Stace Smith
 2011 Stace Smith
 2010 Stace Smith
 2009 Stace Smith
 2008 Stace Smith
 2007 Stace Smith
 2006 Stace Smith
 2005 Stace Smith
 2004 Stace Smith
 2003 Scotty Lovelace
 2002 Sammy Andrews
 2001 Mike Cervi
 2000 John Growney
 1999 Ike Sankey
 1998 Mack Altizer
 1997 Bennie Beutler
 1996 Harry Vold
 1995 Harry Vold
 1994 Harry Vold
 1993 Harry Vold
 1992 Harry Vold
 1991 Harry Vold
 1990 Harry Vold
 1989 Harry Vold
 1988 Harry Vold
 1987 Harry Vold
 1986 Walt Alsbaugh
 1985 Cotton Rosser
 1984 Bob Barnes
 1983 Mike Cervi
 1982 Harry Vold
Source:

Bullfighter of the Year 
 2022 Cody Webster
 2021 Cody Webster 
 2020 Cody Webster
 2019 Dusty Tuckness
 2018 Dusty Tuckness
 2017 Dusty Tuckness
 2016 Dusty Tuckness
 2015 Dusty Tuckness
 2014 Dusty Tuckness
 2013 Dusty Tuckness
 2012 Dusty Tuckness
 2011 Dusty Tuckness
 2010 Dusty Tuckness
 2009 Cory Wall
 2008 Darrell Diefenbach
 2007 Joe Baumgartner
 2006 Joe Baumgartner
 2005 Joe Baumgartner
 2004 Joe Baumgartner
Source:

World Champion Bullfighter (inactive) 

 2000 Mike Matt
 1999 Lance Brittan
 1998 Jerry Norton
 1997 Mike Matt
 1996 Mike Matt
 1995 Ronny Sparks
 1994 Rob Smets
 1993 Ronny Sparks
 1992 Ronny Sparks
 1991 Loyd Ketchum
 1990 Greg Rumohr
 1989 Dwayne Hargo
 1988 (tie) Rob Smets
 1988 (tie) Miles Hare
 1987 Mike Horton
 1986 Rob Smets
 1985 Rob Smets
 1984 Rich Chatman
 1983 Rob Smets
 1982 Skipper Voss
 1981 Miles Hare
Source:

Clown of the Year 
 2022 John Harrison
 2021 Justin Rumford 
 2020 Justin Rumford
 2019 Justin Rumford
 2018 Justin Rumford
 2017 Justin Rumford
 2016 Justin Rumford
 2015 Justin Rumford
 2014 Justin Rumford
 2013 Justin Rumford
 2012 Justin Rumford
 2011 Keith Isley
 2010 Keith Isley
 2009 Keith Isley
 2008 Keith Isley
 2007 Keith Isley
 2006 Keith Isley
 2005 Flint Rasmussen
 2004 Flint Rasmussen
 2003 Flint Rasmussen
 2002 Flint Rasmussen
 2001 Flint Rasmussen
 2000 Flint Rasmussen
 1999 Flint Rasmussen
 1998 Flint Rasmussen
 1997 Butch Lehmkuhler
 1996 Lecile Harris
 1995 Lecile Harris
 1994 Lecile Harris
 1991 Butch Lehmkuhler
 1990 Butch Lehmkuhler
 1989 Butch Lehmkuhler
 1988 Quail Dobbs
 1987 Tom Feller
 1986 Ted Kimzey
 1985 Rex Dunn
 1984 Rick Chatman
 1983 Leon Coffee
 1982 Wilbur Plaugher
 1981 Tom Feller
 1980 Rick Young
 1979 Jon Taylor
 1978 Quail Dobbs
 1977 Chuck Henson
Source:

Coors Man in the Can 
 2022 John Harrison
 2021 John Harrison 
 2020 Keith Isley
 2019 Johnny Dudley
 2018 Justin Rumford
 2017 John Harrison
 1988 J.G. Crouch
 1987 Tom Feller
 1986 Quail Dobbs
 1985 Quail Dobbs
 1984 Tom Feller
Source:

Announcer of the Year 
 2022 Garrett Yerigan 
 2021 Garrett Yerigan 
 2020 Bob Tallman
 2019 Bob Tallman
 2018 Bob Tallman
 2017 Bob Tallman
 2016 Wayne Brooks
 2015 Randy Corley
 2014 Wayne Brooks
 2013 Wayne Brooks
 2012 Boyd Polhamus
 2011 Randy Corley
 2010 Wayne Brooks
 2009 Boyd Polhamus
 2008 Boyd Polhamus
 2007 Boyd Polhamus
 2006 Bob Tallman
 2005 Wayne Brooks
 2004 Bob Tallman
 2003 Randy Corley
 2002 Hadley Barrett
 2001 Bob Tallman
 2000 Bob Tallman
 1999 Bob Tallman
 1998 Randy Corley
 1997 Bob Tallman
 1996 Randy Corley
 1995 Randy Corley
 1994 Randy Corley
 1993 Randy Corley
 1992 Randy Corley
 1991 Randy Corley
 1990 Randy Corley
 1989 Hadley Barrett
 1988 S.J. "Zoop" Dove
 1987 Bob Tallman
 1986 Clem McSpadden
 1985 Hadley Barrett
 1984 Randy Corley
 1983 Hadley Barrett
 1982 Bob Tallman
Source:

Pickup Man of the Year (new in 2015)
 2022 Matt Twitchell 
 2021 Matt Twitchell 
 2020 Rex Bugbee
 2019 Matt Twitchell
 2018 Chase Cervi
 2017 Gary Rempel
 2016 Chase Cervi
 2015 Matt Twitchell
Source:PRCA Awards, Contract Personnel - Pickup Man of the Year, p. 20.

Timer of the Year (new in 2018) 
 2022 Molly Twitchell
 2021 Molly Twitchell and Michelle Corley (Tie)
 2020 Brenda Crowder
 2019 Shawna Ray
 2018 Kim Sutton
Source:

Music Director of the Year (new in 2017) 
 2022 Benje Bendele 
 2021 Jill Franzen Loden 
 2020 Jill Franzen Loden
 2019 Josh (Hambone) Hilton
 2018 Jill Franzen Loden
 2017 Josh (Hambone) Hilton
Source:

Secretary of the Year 
 2022 Eva Chadwick 
 2021 Brenda Crowder
 2020 Sunni Deb Backstrom
 2019 Brenda Crowder
 2018 Sandy Gwatney
 2017 Amanda Corley-Sanders
 2016 Sandy Gwatney
 2015 Linda Alsbaugh
 2014 Haley Schneeberger
 2013 Haley Schneeberger
 2012 Haley Schneeberger
 2011 Haley Schneeberger
 2010 Haley Schneeberger
 2009 Haley Schneeberger
 2008 Haley Schneeberger
 2007 Haley Schneeberger
 2006 Mildred Farris
 2005 Sunni Deb Backstrome
 2004 Mildred Farris
 2003 Sunni Deb Backstrome
 2002 Mildred Klingermann
 2001 Mildred Farris
 2000 Mildred Farris
 1999 Mildred Farris
 1998 Sunni Deb Backstrom
 1997 Vickie Shireman
 1996 Sunni Deb Backstrome
 1995 Sunni Deb Backstrome
 1994 Sunni Deb Backstrome
 1993 Sunni Deb Backstrome
 1992 Sunni Deb Backstrome
 1991 Sunni Deb Backstrome
 1990 Sunni Deb Backstrome
 1989 Mildred Farris
 1988 Mildred Farris
 1987 Mildred Farris
 1986 Mildred Farris
 1985 Cindy Moreno
Source:

Specialty Act of the Year 
 2022 Bobby Kerr (dress)
 2022 John Harrison (comedy)
 2021 Bobby Kerr (dress)
 2021 John Harrison (comedy)
 2020 Rider Kiesner and Benthany Iles (dress)
 2020 John Harrison (comedy)
 2019 Bobby Kerr (dress)
 2019 Justin Rumford (comedy)
 2018 Tomas Garcilazo (dress)
 2018 Cody Sosebee (comedy)
 2017 Bobby Kerr (dress)
 2017 Gizmo McCracken (comedy)
 2016 John, Lynn and Amanda Payne (dress)
 2016 John Harrison (comedy)
 2015 John Payne and Amanda Payne (dress)
 2015 John Harrison (comedy)
 2014 John Payne and Amanda Payne (dress)
 2014 John Harrison (comedy)
 2013 Tomas Garcilazo (dress)
 2013 Keith Isley (comedy)
 2012 Tomas Garcilazo (dress)
 2012 John Harrison (comedy)
 2011 John Payne (dress)
 2011 Keith Isley (comedy)
 2010 John Payne (dress)
 2010 Keith Isley (comedy)
 2009 John Payne (dress)
 2009 Keith Isley (comedy)
 2008 John Payne (dress)
 2008 Troy Lerwill (comedy)
 2007 Tomas Garcilazo (dress)
 2007 Troy Lerwill (comedy)
 2006 Keith Isley (dress)
 2006 Troy Lerwill (comedy)
 2005 Tommy Lucia (dress)
 2005 Troy Lerwill (comedy)
 2004 Tommy Lucia (dress)
 2004 Keith Isley (comedy)
 2003 Tommy Lucia (dress)
 2003 Troy Lerwill (comedy)
 2002 Keith Isley (dress)
 2002 Troy Lerwill (comedy)
 2001 Keith Isley
 2000 Keith Isley
 1999 Keith Isley
 1998 Jerry Diaz
 1997 Leon and Vicki Adams
 1996 John Payne
 1995 John Payne
 1994 John Payne
 1993 John Payne
 1992 John Payne
 1991 John Payne
 1990 John Payne
 1989 John Payne
 1988 Jerry Wayne and Judy Olson
 1987 Leon and Vicki Adams
 1986 J.W. Stoker
 1985 J.W. Stoker
 1984 Vicki Adams
 1983 Jerry Olson
 1982 Leon Adams
Source:

Donita Barnes Contract Personnel Lifetime Achievement Award
 2022 Bronc Rumford
 2021 Kay Gay
 2020 Cindy Rosser
 2019 Roy & Virginia Honeycutt
 2018 Hadley Barrett
 2017 Jim and Julie Sutton
 2016 Karen Vold
 2015 Cotton Rosser
 2014 Quail Dobbs
 2013 Fred and Norma Korenkamp
 2012 Art and Linda Alsbaugh
 2011 Donita Barnes
Source:

Veterinarian of the Year 

Source:

Linderman Award 

Source:

Remuda Award for Best Stock Contractor 
Brought best pen of bucking horses
 2022  J Bar J
 2021 Calgary Stampede
 2020 Summit Pro Rodeo
2019 Powder River Rodeo
 2018 Sankey Pro Rodeo and Robinson Bulls
 2017 Korkow Rodeo
 2016 Frontier Rodeo
 2015 Three Hills Rodeo
 2014 J Bar J
 2013 Harry Vold Rodeo
 2012 Frontier Rodeo
 2011 Bar T Rodeo
 2010 J Bar J
 2009 Calgary Stampede
 2008 John Growney
 2007 Beutler & Son Rodeo
 2006 Bud Kerby
 2005 Stace Smith
 2004 Stace Smith
Source:

Remuda Award for Best Rodeo Committee 
Assembled best pen of bucking horses

Source:

Rookie of the Year Awards

Overall Rookie of the Year 

2010 was the last year the PRCA named an Overall Rookie of the Year
 2010 Dylan Werner, Bushnell, Florida
 2009 Kaleb Driggers, Albany Georgia
 2008 Tuf Cooper, Decatur, Texas*
 2007 Brad Pierce, Snyder, Texas
 2006 Cody James, Monticello, Arkansas
 2005 Steve Woolsey, Spanish Fork, Utah
 2004 Clayton Foltyn, El Campo, Texas
 2003 Matt Austin, Wills Point, Texas
 2002 Will Lowe, Gardner, Kansas*
 2001 Matt Robertson, Augusta, Montana
 2000 Luke Branquinho, Los Alamos, California*
 1999 Cash Myers, Athens, Texas
 1998 Danell Tipton, Spencer, Oklahoma
 1997 Mike White, Lake Charles, Louisiana*
 1996 Shane Slack, Idabel, Oklahoma
 1995 Curt Lyons, Ardmore, Oklahoma
 1994 Cody Ohl, Orchard, Texas*
 1993 Blair Burk, Durant, Oklahoma
 1992 Rope Myers, Athens, Texas
 1991 Brent Lewis, Pinon, New Mexico
 1990 Fred Whitfield, Cypress, Texas*
 1989 David Bailey, Tahlequah, Oklahoma
 1988 Ty Murray, Odessa, Texas*
 1987 Tony Currin, Heppner, Oregon
 1986 Jim Sharp, Kermit, Texas*
 1985 Joe Beaver, Victoria, Texas*
 1984 Sam Poutous, Julian, California
 1983 Jacky Gibbs, Ivanhoe, Texas
 1982 Clark Hankins, Rocksprings, Texas
 1981 John W. Jones Jr., Morro Bay, California
 1980 Jimmie Cooper, Monument, New Mexico*
 1979 Jerry Jetton, Stephenville, Texas
 1978 Dee Pickett, Caldwell, Idaho*
 1977 Jimmy Cleveland, Hollis, Oklahoma
 1976 Roy Cooper, Durant, Oklahoma*
 1975 Don Smith, Kiowa, Oklahoma
 1974 Lee Phillips, Carseland, Alberta, Canada
 1973 Bob Blandford, San Antonio, Texas
 1972 Dave Brock, Goodland, Kansas*
 1971 Kent Youngblood, Lamesa, Texas
 1970 Dick Aronson, Tempe, Arizona
 1969 Phil Lyne, George West, Texas*
 1968 Bowie Wesley, Wildorado, Texas
 1967 Jay Himes, Beulah, Colorado
 1966 Tony Haberer, Muleshoe, Texas
 1965 Dan Willis, Aquilla, Texas
 1964 Jim Steen, Glenn's Ferry, Idaho
 1963 Bill Kornell, Salmon, Idaho
 1962 Jim Houston, Omaha, Nebraska*
 1961 Kenny McLean, Okanagan Falls, British Columbia, Canada*
 1960 Larry Kane, Big Sandy, Montana
 1959 Harry Charters, Melba, Idaho*
 1958 Benny Reynolds, Melrose, Montana*
 1957 Bob A. Robinson, Tuttle, Idaho*
 1956 John W. Jones Sr., San Luis Obispo, California*
Source:
*later became a world champion

All-Around Rookie of the Year 
 2022 Riley Webb, Denton, Texas, $116,905
 2021 Slade Wood, New Ulm, Texas, $75,908
 2020 Britt Smith, Broken Bow, Oklahoma, $21,778
 2019 Stetson Wright, Milford, Utah, $114,923*
 2018 Tanner Green, Cotulla, Texas, $52,394
 2017 Nelson Wyatt, Clanton, Alabama, $54,317
 2016 Taylor Santos, California
 2015 Jace Melvin, Fort Pierre, South Dakota
 2014 Billy Bob Brown, Stephenville, Texas
 2013 Caleb Smidt, Yorktown, Texas
 2012 Dakota Eldridge, Elko, Nevada
 2011 Chris Selfors, Minot, North Dakota
 2010 Ace Slone, Cuero, Texas
 2009 Chad Bouchard, Rolling Hills, Alberta, Canada
 2008 Trell Etbauder, Goodwell, Oklahoma
 2007 Brad Pierce, Snyder, Texas
 2006 Steven Dent, Mullen, Nebraska
 2005 Steve Woolsey, Spanish Fork, Utah
 2004 Clayton Foltyn, El Campo, Texas
 2003 Clint Robinson, Farmington, Utah
 2002 Bobby Harter, Aledo, Texas
 2001 Matt Robertson, Augusta, Montana
 2000 Kyle Hughes, Model, Colorado
 1999 Cash Myers, Athens, Texas
 1996-1998 **
 1995 Bubba Paschal, LaPorte, Texas
 1994 Marty Becker, Manyberries, Alberta, Canada
 1991-1993 **
 1990 Dan Mortensen, Billings, Montana*
Source:
*later became a world champion
**no All-Around Rookie was named for there is no record thereof

Bareback Riding Rookie of the Year 
 2022 Rocker Steiner, Weatherford, Texas, $134,327 
 2021 Cole Franks, Clarendon, Texas, $77,393
 2020 Cole Reiner, Kaycee, Wyoming, $154,325
 2019 Garrett Shadbolt, $54,580
 2018 Zach Hibler, Wheeler, Texas, $42,877
 2017 Tanner Phipps, Dalton, Georgia, $57,739
 2016 Clayton Biglow, Clements, California*
 2015 Wyatt Denny, Minden, Nebraska
 2014 Kody Lamb, Sherwood Park, Alberta, Canada
 2013 Tim O'Connell, Zwingle, Iowa*
 2012 Austin Foss, Terrebonne, Oregon
 2011 J.R. Vezain, Cowley, Wyoming
 2010 Ty Breuer, Mandan, North Dakota
 2009 Steven Peebles, Redmond, Oregon*
 2008 Jared Smith, Ranger, Texas
 2007 Tilden Hooper, Carthaeg, Texas
 2006 Steven Dent, Mullen, Nebraska
 2005 Justin McDaniel, Porum, Oklahoma*
 2004 Dusty LaValley, Debolt, Alberta, Canada
 2003 Clint Cannon, Waller, Texas
 2002 Will Lowe, Gardner, Kansas*
 2001 Tyson Thompson, Templeton, California
 2000 Billy Griffin, Raytown, Missouri
 1999 J.D. Garrett Jr., Newell, South Dakota
 1998 Kenton Randle, Fort Vermillion, Alberta, Canada
 1997 Scott Montague, Fruitdale, South Dakota
 1996 Dusty McCollister, Acworth, Georgia
 1995 Davey Shields Jr., Hanna, Alberta, Canada
 1994 Mark Gomes, Florence, Arizona*
 1993 Jason Jackson, Nespelem, Washington
 1992 Beau Mayo, Dublin, Texas
 1991 Vern Millen, Rapid City, South Dakota
 1990 Jack Sims, Hutchinson, Kansas
 1989 D.J. Johnson, Hutchinson, Kansas
 1988 Ty Murray, Odessa, Texas*
 1987 Ken Lensegrav, Meadow, South Dakota
 1986 Colin Murnion, Jordan, Montana
 1985 Tom Henrie, Mesquite, Nevada
 1984 Marvin Garrett, Belle Fourche, South Dakota*
 1983 Stephen Smith, Hollywood, California
 1982 Steve Carter, Klamath Falls, Oregon
 1981 Brent Larreau, Denver, Colorado
 1980 Lewis Feild, Peoa, Utah*
 1979 Chuck Logue, New Braunfels, Texas*
 1978 Brian Jacobson, Glenbush, Saskatchewan, Canada
 1977 Jimmy Cleveland, Hollis, Oklahoma
Source:
*later became a world champion

Steer Wrestling Rookie of the Year 
 2022 Landris White, Angleton, Texas, $32,668 
 2021 Marc Joiner, Loranger, Louisiana, $32,757
 2020 Gabe Soileau, Lake Charles, Louisiana, $18,139
 2019 Dennell Henderson, $47,347
 2018  Brendan Laye, Consort, Alberta, Canada, $30,767
 2017 Jesse Brown, Baker City, Oregon, $15,501
 2016 Stephen Culling, Fort St. John, British Columbia, Canada
 2015 J.D. Sruxness, Appleton, Wisconsin
 2014 Rowdy Parrott, Bellville, Texas
 2013 Jason Thomas, Benton, Arkansas
 2012 Dakota Eldrige, Elko, Nevada
 2011 Ty Erickson, Helena, Montana*
 2010 Cody Moore, Artesia, New Mexico
 2009 Chad Bouchard, Rolling Hills, New Mexico
 2008 Zack Cobb, Pampa, Texas
 2007 Parker Howell, Stillwell, Oklahoma
 2006 Daniel Yates, Red Lodge, Montana
 2005 Seth Brockman, Wheatland, Wyoming
 2004 Ryan Jarett, Summerville, Georgia*
 2003 Baillie Milan, Cochrane, Alberta, Canada
 2002 Kenny Coppini, Ferndale, California
 2001 Josh Lessman, Sidney, Nebraska
 2000 Luke Branquinho, Los Alamos, California*
 1999 Cash Myers, Athens, Texas
 1998 Tyler Woodland, Weiser, Idaho
 1997 Chad Biesemeyer, Martin, Texas
 1996 Teddy Johnson, Checotah, Oklahoma*
 1995 Bubba Paschal, LaPorta, Texas
 1994 Brad Morgan, Hugo, Oklahoma
 1993 Brett Zieffle, Consort, Alberta, Canada
 1992 Rope Myers, Athens, Texas*
 1991 Thad Olson, Prairie City, South Dakota
 1990 Coty Batles, Detroit, Texas
 1989 Shawn Wharton, Mineral Wells, Texas
 1988 Mike Smith, Lake Charles, Louisiana*
 1987 Tony Currin, Heppner, Oregon
 1986 Phillip Munnerlyn, Seagoville, Texas
 1985 Steve Duhon, Opelousas, Louisiana*
 1984 Tom Switzer, San Louis Obispo, California
 1983 Doug Houston, Tucson, Arizona
 1982 Lance Robinson, Spanish Fork, Utah
 1981 Gary Green, Keithville, Louisiana
 1980 Jimmie Cooper, Monument, New Mexico
 1979 Leonard Fluitt, Uvalde, Texas
 1978 Dudley Little, San Ardo, California
 1977 Steve Bland, Trent, Texas
Source:
*later became a world champion

Team Roping Rookie of the Year 
 2022 Tanner James (Header), Porterville, California, $46,323 
 2022 Junior Zambrano (Heeler), Nogales, Arizona, $29,233  
 2021 John Gaona (Header), Winkleman, Arizona, $26,872
 2021 Caleb Hendrix (Heeler), Fallon, Nevada, $58,355
 2020 Tanner Tomlinson (Header), Angleton, Texas, $22,534.24
 2020 Clay Futrell (Heeler), Union Grove, North Carolina, $34,501.61
 2019 Kal Fuller (Header), Bozeman, Montana, $41,762
 2019 Paden Bray (Heeler), Stephenville, Texas $67,014
 2018 Jeff Flenniken, Caldwell, Idaho, (Header) $61,826
 2018 Ross Ashford, Lott, Texas, (Heeler) $26,917
 2017 Nelson Wyatt, Clanton, Alabama, (Header) $52,012
 2017 Cody Hogan, Athens, Texas (Heeler) $43,793
 2016 Dustin Egusquiza, Mariana, Florida
 2016 Dalton Pearce, San Luis Obispo, California
 2015 Cody Snow, Los Olivos, California
 2015 Quinn Kesler, Holden, Utah
 2014 Rhett Anderson, Anabella, Utah
 2014 Junior Nogueria, Scottsdale, Arizona*
 2013 Chace Thompson, Munday, Texas
 2013 Will Woodfin, Marshall, Texas
 2012 Tyler Wade, Terrell, Texas
 2012 Clint Summers, Lake City, Florida
 2011 Joshua Torres, Bell City, Louisiana
 2011 Dakota Kirchenschlager, DeLeon, Texas
 2010 Kaden Richard, Roosevelt, Utah
 2010 Matt Garza, Las Cruces, New Mexico
 2009 Kaleb Driggers (hd), Albany, Georgia*
 2009 Justin Hendrick (hl), Rosenberg, Texas
 2008 Joel Bach (hd), Milsap, Texas
 2008 Rhen Richard (hl), Roosevelt, Utah
 2007 Justin Young (hd), Altha, Florida
 2007 Broc Cresta (hl), Santa Rosa, California
 2006 Keven Daniel (hd), Altha, Florida
 2006 Jade Corkill (hl), Fallon, Nevada*
 2005 Brandon Beers (hd), Powell Butte, Oregon
 2005 Douglass Gillespie (hl), Arrowhead, Alberta, Canada
 2004 Jake Cooper (hd), Monument, New Mexico
 2004 Jim Ross Cooper (hl), Stephenville, Texas
 2003 Jason Adams (hd), Logandale, Nevada
 2003 Patrick Smith (hl), Midland, Texas*
 2002 Travis Gallais (hd), Olds, Alberta, Canada
 2002 Randon Adams (hl), Logandale, Nevada*
 2001 Reese Ker (hd), Cotulla, Texas
 2001 Matt Robertson (hl), Augusta, Montana
 2000 Nick Sartain (hd), Yukon, Oklahoma*
 2000 Trey Johnson (hl) Lovington, New Mexico
 1999 Ty Thomas (hd) Idabel, Oklahoma
 1999 Craig Branham (hl), Canyon Country, California
 1998 Charly Crawford (hd), Canby, Oregon
 1998 John Paul Lucero (hl), Villanueva, New Mexico
 1997 Kit Sherwood (hd), Snowflake, Arizona
 1997 Kyle Lockett (hl), Ivanhoe, California
 1996 Scooter Nolen Jr. (hd), Whitesboro, Texas
 1996 Mickey Gomez (hl), Salado, Texas
 1995 Shad Chadwick, Mesa, Arizona
 1994 Brye Sayer, Phoenix, Arizona
 1993 Nick Sarchett, Scottsdale, Arizona
 1992 Britt Bockius, Dewey, Oklahoma
 1991 Martin Lucero, Villa Nueva, New Mexico
 1990 Liddon Cowden, Merced, California
 1989 Andy Anaya, Tucson, Arizona
 1988 Flynn Farris, Dalhart, Texas
 1987 Charles Pogue, Ringling, Oklahoma
 1986 Dennis Gatz, Oakdale, California
 1985 Jerry Buckles, Scottsbluff, Nebraska
 1984 William "Rusty" Wright, Mount Pleasant, Texas
 1983 Joel Maker, Poeau, Oklahoma
 1982 Mike Fuller, Clarkston, Washington
 1982 Chris Henderson, Coulee City, Washington
 1981 Bret Beach, Gilbert, Arizona
 1980 Tee Woolman, Llano, Texas*
 1979 Bill E. Parker, Billings, Montana
 1978 Brian Burrows, Reedley, California
 1977 Brian Murphy, Paradise Valley, California
Source:
*later became a world champion

Saddle Bronc Riding Rookie of the Year 
 2022 Damian Brennan, Injune, Queensland, Australia, $92,706 
 2021 K’s Thompson, Lundbreck, Alberta, Canada, $79,972
 2020 Riggin Smith, Winterset, Iowa, $27,164
 2019 Stetson Wright, Milford, Utah, $71,300*
 2018 Dawson Hay, Wildwood, Alberta, Canada, $39,605
 2017 Shade Etbauer, Goodwell, Oklahoma, $41,726
 2016 Ryder Wright, Milford, Utah*
 2015 CoBurn Bradshaw, Beaver, Utah
 2014 Rusty Wright, Milford, Utah
 2013 Ty Kirkland, Lufkin, Texas
 2012 Spencer Wright, Milford, Utah*
 2011 Sterling Crawley, College Station, Texas
 2010 Troy Crowser, Whitewood, South Dakota
 2009 Jesse Wright, Milford, Utah*
 2008 Kaleb Asay, Powell, Wyoming
 2007 Jesse Kruse, Great Falls, Montana*
 2006 Tyler Corrington, Hastings, Minnesota
 2005 Todd Herzog, Penhold, Alberta, Canada
 2004 Matt Hebbert, Hyannis, Nebraska
 2003 Sam Spreadborough, Snyder, Texas
 2002 Mo Forbes, Kaycee, Wyoming
 2001 Billy Richards, Cochrane, Alberta, Canada
 2000 Cody Martin, Hatfield, Arkansas
 1999 Rance Bray, Texhoma, Oklahoma
 1998 Mike Outhier, Weatherford, Oklahoma
 1997 T.C. Holloway, Eagle Butte, South Dakota
 1996 Scott Johnson, Booral, New South Wales, Australia
 1995 J.T. Hitch, Stilesville, Indiana
 1994 Glen O'Neill, Strathmore, Alberta, Canada*
 1993 Kelly Palmer, Stigler, Oklahoma
 1992 Kenny Taton, Mud Butte, South Oklahoma
 1991 Toby Adams, Red Bluff, California
 1990 Dan Mortensen, Billings, Montana*
 1989 Rod Hay, Mayerthorpe, Alberta, Canada
 1988 Craig Latham, Kaycee, Wyoming
 1987 Kyle Wemple, Milford, California
 1986 Tom Wagoner, Buffalo, Wyoming
 1985 Robert Etbauer, Goodwell, Oklahoma*
 1984 Guy Shapka, Spruce View, Alberta, Canada
 1983 Terry Carlon, Lawen, Oregon
 1982 Kip Farnsworth, Anderson, California
 1981 Rich Thomas, Pendleton, Oregon
 1980 Brad Gjermundson, Marshall, North Dakota,
 1979 Charlie Atwell, Huntersville, North Carolina
 1978 Bud Pauley, Miles City, Montana
 1977 Jim Bode Scott, Billings, Montana
Source:
*later became a world champion

Tie-Down Roping Rookie of the Year 
 2022 Riley Webb, Denton, Texas, $120,334 
 2021 Beau Cooper, Stettler, Alberta, Canada, $49,247
 2020 Luke Potter, Maple City, Kansas, $34,300.56
 2019 Haven Meged, Miles, Montana, $246,013.45
 2018 Ty Harris, San Angelo, Texas, $62,752
 2017 Tyler Milligan, Pawhuska, $53,870
 2016 Westyn Hughes, Caldwell, Texas
 2015 Trey Young, Dupree, South Dakota
 2014 John "Catfish" Brown, Collinsville, Texas
 2013 Caleb Smidt, Yorktown, Texas*
 2012 Reese Riemer, Stinnett, Texas
 2011 Jud Nowotny, LaVernia, Texas
 2010 Ace Slone, Cuero, Texas
 2009 Shane Hanchey, Sulphur, Louisiana*
 2008 Tuf Cooper, Decatur, Texas*
 2007 Sterling Smith, Stephenville, Texas
 2006 Cody James, Monticello, Arkansas
 2005 Jerrad Hofstetter, Athens, Texas
 2004 Caddo Lewallen, Morrison, Oklahoma
 2003 Clint Robinson, Farmington, Utah
 2002 Scott Kormos, Mexia, Texas
 2001 Brady Brock, Springtown, Texas
 2000 Kyle Hughes, Model, Colorado
 1999 Josh Crow, Lovington, New Mexico
 1998 Chance Tinney, Winnsboro, Texas
 1997 Clay Cerny, Eagle Lake, Texas
 1996 Shane Slack, Idabel, Oklahoma
 1995 Chad Johnson, Cut Bank, Montana
 1994 Cody Ohl, Orchard, Texas*
 1993 Blair Burk, Durant, Oklahoma
 1992 Marty Lindner, Giddings, Texas
 1991 Brent Lewis, Pinon, New Mexico
 1990 Fred Whitfield, Cypress, Texas
 1989 Morris Ledford, Comanche, Oklahoma
 1988 David Felton, Weatherford, Texas
 1987 Ricky Canton, Houston, Texas
 1986 David Bowen, Yoakum, Texas
 1985 Joe Beaver, Victoria, Texas*
 1984 Harold "Puddin" Payne, Stillwater, Oklahoma
 1983 James Zant, Harper, Texas
 1982 Clark Hankins, Rocksprings, Texas
 1981 Jim Light, Santo, Texas
 1980 Jimmie Cooper, Monument, New Mexico*
 1979 Jerry Jetton, Stephenville, Texas
 1978 Dee Pickett, Caldwell, Idaho*
Source:
*later became a world champion

Bull Riding Rookie of the Year 
 2022 Lukasey Morris, Union City, Oklahoma, $100,667  
 2021 Creek Young, Springfield, Missouri, $243,647
 2020 Colten Fritzlan, Rifle, Colorado, $241,446
 2019 Stetson Wright, Milford, Utah, 267,344*
 2018 Clayton Sellars, Fruitland Park, Florida, $90,863
 2017 Boudreaux Campbell, Crockett, Texas, $88,063
 2016 Roscoe Jarbone, New Plymouth, Idaho
 2015 Bryce Barrios, Bluff Dale, Texas
 2014 Sage Kimzey, Strong City, Oklahoma*
 2013 Cooper Davis, Jasper, Texas
 2012 Trey Benton III, Rock Island, Texas
 2011 Chandler Bownds, Lubbock, Texas
 2010 Dylan Werner, Bushnell, Florida
 2009 Tyler Willis, Wheatland, Wyoming
 2008 Douglas Duncan, Huntsville, Texas
 2007 Brad Pierce, Snyder, Texas
 2006 Edgard Oliveira, Denton, Texas
 2005 Steve Woolsey, Spanish Fork, Utah
 2004 Clayton Foltyn, El Campo, Texas
 2003 Matt Austin, Wills Point, Texas*
 2002 Robbie Russell, Jacksonville, Texas
 2001 Slade Malone, Devine, Texas
 2000 Zack Brown, Yorba Linda, California
 1999 Felipe Aragon, Tome, New Mexico
 1998 Danell Tipton, Spencer, Oklahoma
 1997 Mike White, Lake Charles, Louisiana*
 1996 Tony Mendes, Reno, Nevada
 1995 Curt Lyons, Ardmore, Oklahoma
 1994 Chad Brennan, Ellsworth, Nebraska
 1993 Shawn Egg, Hockley, Texas
 1992 Gilbert Carillo, El Paso, Texas
 1991 Ty Watkins, Monahans, Texas
 1990 Michael Gaffney, Lubbock, Texas
 1989 David Bailey, Tahlequah, Oklahoma
 1988 David Berry, Locust Grove, Oklahoma
 1987 Kevin Smith, Allen, Nebraska
 1986 Jim Sharp, Kermit, Texas*
 1985 Scott Breding, Billings, Montana
 1984 Sam Poutous, Julian, California
 1983 Jacky Gibbs, Ivanhoe, Texas
 1982 Denny Weir, Carthage, Texas
 1981 Robert Christie, Spanish Fork, Utah
 1980 Ted Nuce, Manteca, California*
 1979 Gary Toole, Mangum, Oklahoma
 1978 Scott Brauchie, San Antonio, Texas
 1977 Allan Jordan Jr., Bloomington, California
Source:
*later become a world champion

Steer Roping Rookie of the Year 
 2022 Logan Currie, Wharton, Texas, $17,297 
 2021 Slade Wood, New Ulm, Texas, $54,430
 2020 Dalton Walker, Clyde, Texas, $13,841
 2019 Cole Patterson, $38,251*
 2018 Chance Jasperson, Hudson Oaks, Texas, $10,243
 2017 Kelton McMillen, Paden, Oklahoma, $8,625
 2016 Matt Garrett, Barnsdall, Oklahoma
 2015 Thomas Smith, Barnsdall, Oklahoma#
 2014 Tom Smith, Barnsdall, Oklahoma
 2013 Brodie Poppino, Big Cabin, Oklahoma
 2012 Joe Wells, Cisco, Texas
 2011 Rob Denny, Willcox, Arizona
 2010 Gannon Quimby, Mannford, Oklahoma
 2009 Spicer Lewis, Abilene, Texas
 2008 Tim Abbott, Midland, Texas
 2007 K.W. Lauer, Buffalo, Oklahoma
 2006 Tyler Mayse, Ponca City, Oklahoma
 2005 Cody Scheck, Buffalo, Oklahoma
 2004 Brady Garten, Pawhuska, Oklahoma
 2003 Neal Wood, Guy, Texas
 2002 Jarrett Blessing, Paradise, Texas
 2001 John McDaniel, Adair, Oklahoma
 2000 Scott Bliss, Sheridan, Wyoming
 1999 Bobby Brock, Cushing, Oklahoma
 1998 Clay Cameron, Claude, Texas
 1997 Paul Patton, Abilene, Texas
 1996 Trevor Brazile, Decatur, Texas*
 1995 Jimmy Vaughan, Argyle, Texas
 1994 Kenyon Burns, Lovington, New Mexico
 1993 J. Paul Williams, Ponca City, Oklahoma
 1992 Rocky Patterson, Pratt, Kansas*
 1991 Todd Casebolt, Sinton, Texas
 1990 Scott Stickley, Denton, Texas
 1989 Bucky Hefner, Chelsea, Oklahoma
 1988 Ben Ingham, Sonora, Texas
 1987 Vance McNeil, Pecos, Texas
 1986 Phillip Berry, Lovington, New Mexico
 1985 Kress Jones, Hobbs, New Mexico
 1984 Roy Brooks, Amarillo, Texas
 1983 Jerry Bailey, Washington, Oklahoma
 1982 Tommy Pearson, Eunice, New Mexico
 1981 Shaun Burchett, Pryor, Oklahoma*
 1980 Clark Victory, Chelsea, Oklahoma
 1979 Bucky Lee Braden, Ponca City, Oklahoma
 1978 Bobby Harris, Gillette, Wyoming*
 1977 Jimmy Brazile, Gruver, Texas
Source:
*later became a world champion
#2015 Steer Roping Rookie of the Year Thomas Smith is the son of Tom Smith, 2014 winner.

Barrel Racing Rookie of the Year 
 2022 Bayleigh Choate, Fort Worth, Texas, $182,971
 2021 Kylee Scribner, Azle, Texas, $47,312  
 2020 Paige Jones, Wayne, Oklahoma, $20,985
 2019 Carly Taylor, Andersonville, Tennessee, $72,300
 2018 Jimmie Smith
 2017 Taci Bettis, Round Top, Texas, $97,023
 2016 Cayla (Melby) Small
 2015 Jackie Ganter
 2014 Sarah Rose McDonald
 2013 Taylor Jacob
 2012 Emily Efurd
 2011 Lee Ann Rust
 2010 Lindsey Ewing
 2009 Kelli Tobert
 2008 Syndi Blanchard
 2007 Julie Erkamma
 2006 Audrey Ridgeway
 2005 Chani Payne
 2004 Sabrina Lay
 2003 Brittany Pozzi
 2002 Jill Besplug
 2001 Connie Morris
 2000 Gloria Freeman
 1999 Jodi Hollingworth
 1998 Shelle Shaw
 1997 Peyton Raney
 1996 Trula Truitt
 1995 Ramona Scott
 1994 Mindy Schueneman
 1993 JoAnn Middleton
 1992 Sharon Smith
 1991 Donna Kennedy
 1990 Melody Smith
 1989 Charlotte Schmidt
 1988 Vana Beissinger
 1987 Lana Merrick-Hemsted
 1986 Laura Farley
 1985 Tacy Cates-Johnson
 1984 Charmayne James
 1983 Sherry Elms
 1982 Kathy Spears
 1981 Lee Ann Guilkey
 1980 Wanda Cagliari
 1979 Lynn Manning-Flynn
 1978 Carol Goostree
 1977 Jackie Jo Perrin
 1976 Darla Higgins
 1975 Lynne Mayes
 1974 Colette Graves-Baier
 1973 Cheryl Luman
 1972 Jann Kremling
 1971 Martha Tompkins-Wright
 1970 Joleen Hurst Steiner
 1969 Lee Natalie
 1968 Ann Lewis
 1967 Patti Mack-Prather
Source:

Breakaway Roping Rookie of the Year 
 2022 Josie Conner, Iowa, Louisiana, $48,138   
 2021 Madison Outhier, Fulshear, Texas, $20,000

Livestock Awards

Bucking Bull of the Year

Source:

Saddle Bronc Horse of the Year 

Source:

Bareback Horse of the Year 

Source:

Stock of the Year, 1956-1973 
From 1956-1973, only one bucking horse was named every year.

Source:

AQHA/PRCA/WPRA Horse of the Year 

Source:

Top NFR Bucking Stock 

Source:

Rodeo Committees of the Year

1984-1992 

*In 1991, this category was divided into Outdoor Rodeo Committee of the Year and Indoor Rodeo Committee of the Year. The outdoor committee was split again in 1993. Then, there was the Large Outdoor Rodeo Committee of the Year and Small Outdoor Rodeo Committee of the Year awards. In 2004, the Medium Rodeo Committee of the Year award was added.
Source:

Large Outdoor Rodeo Committee of the Year 
($10,000 and more added per event)

Source:

Medium Rodeo Committee of the Year 
($3,000 to $9,999 added money per event)

Source:

Small Rodeo Committee of the Year 
(Less than $3,000 added money per event)

Source:

Large Indoor Rodeo Committee of the Year 

Source:

John Justin Committeeman of the Year

See also
 Lists of rodeo performers
 Bull Riding Hall of Fame
 Professional Bull Riders
 Professional Rodeo Cowboys Association
 ProRodeo Hall of Fame
 American Bucking Bull
 International Professional Rodeo Association
 Bull Riders Only 
 Championship Bull Riding
 ProRodeo Hall of Fame
 Women's Professional Rodeo Association

References

Bibliography

External links 
 Professional Rodeo Cowboys Association
 ProRodeo Hall of Fame
 Women's Professional Rodeo Association

Organizations established in 1975
Rodeo organizations
Organizations based in Colorado Springs, Colorado
Sports in Colorado Springs, Colorado
Rodeo in the United States
Rodeo competition series
Sports in Las Vegas
Champions
Organizations based in Colorado
Professional cowboys
Lists of sports awards